= Neoclassicism in France =

Artistic movement

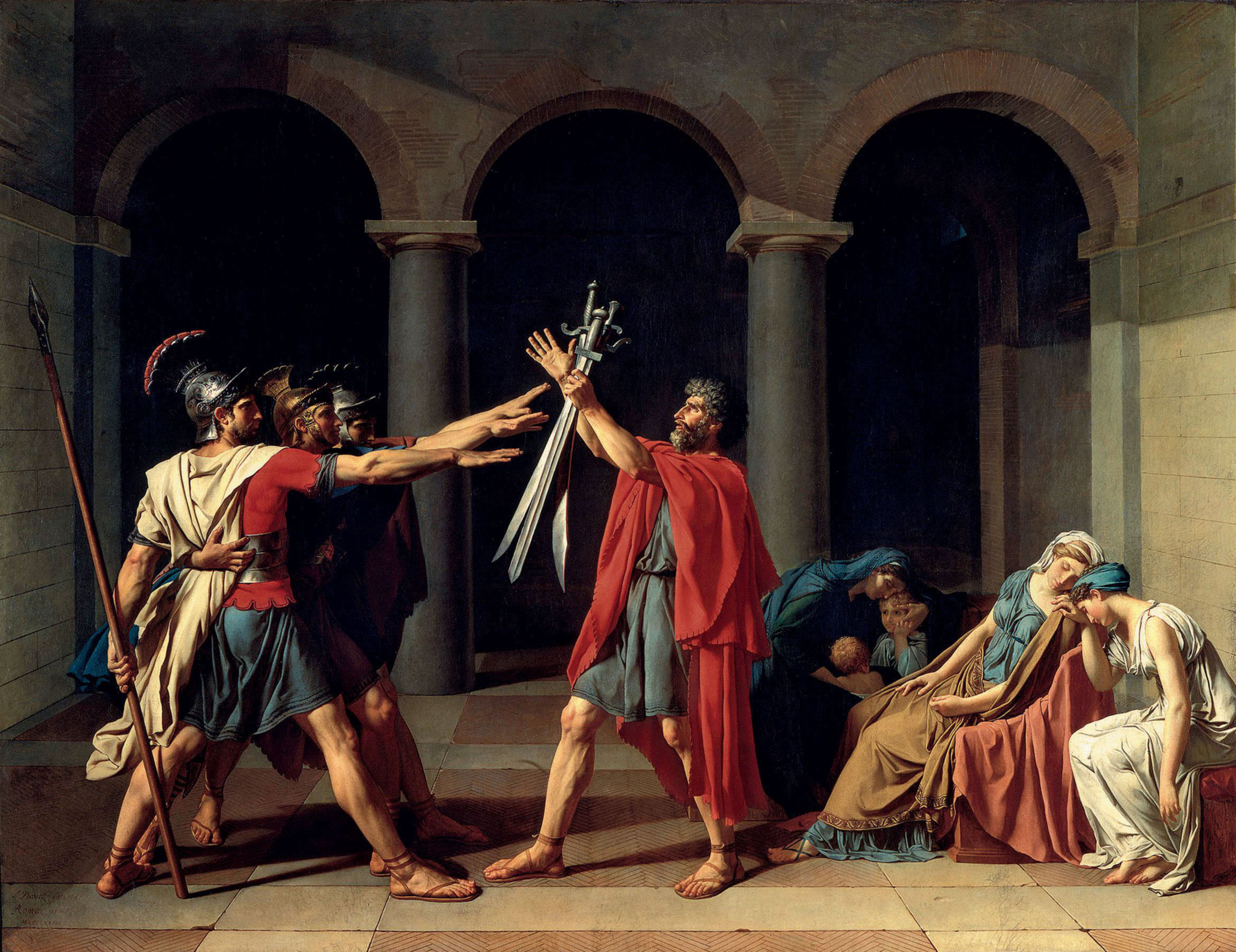
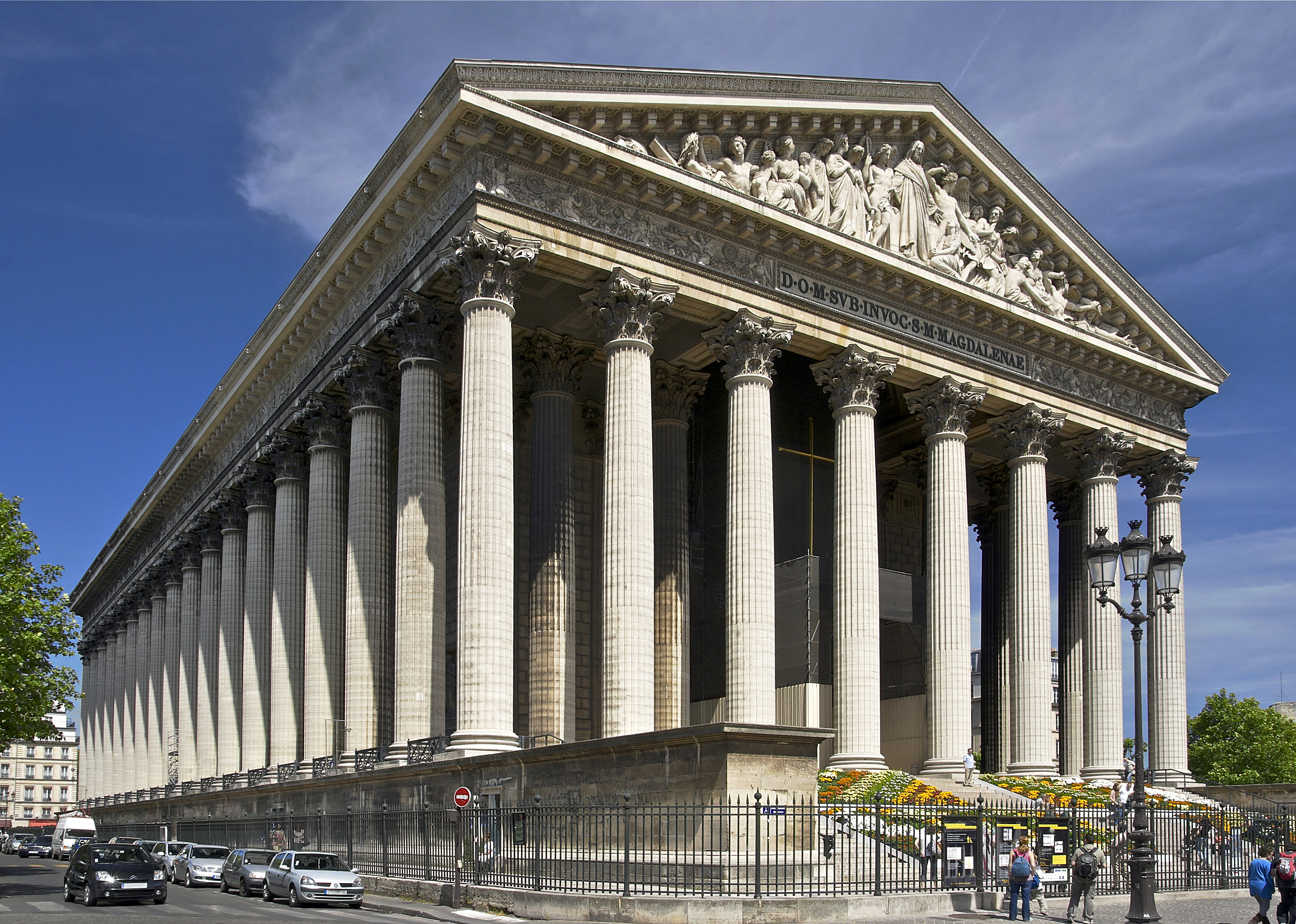
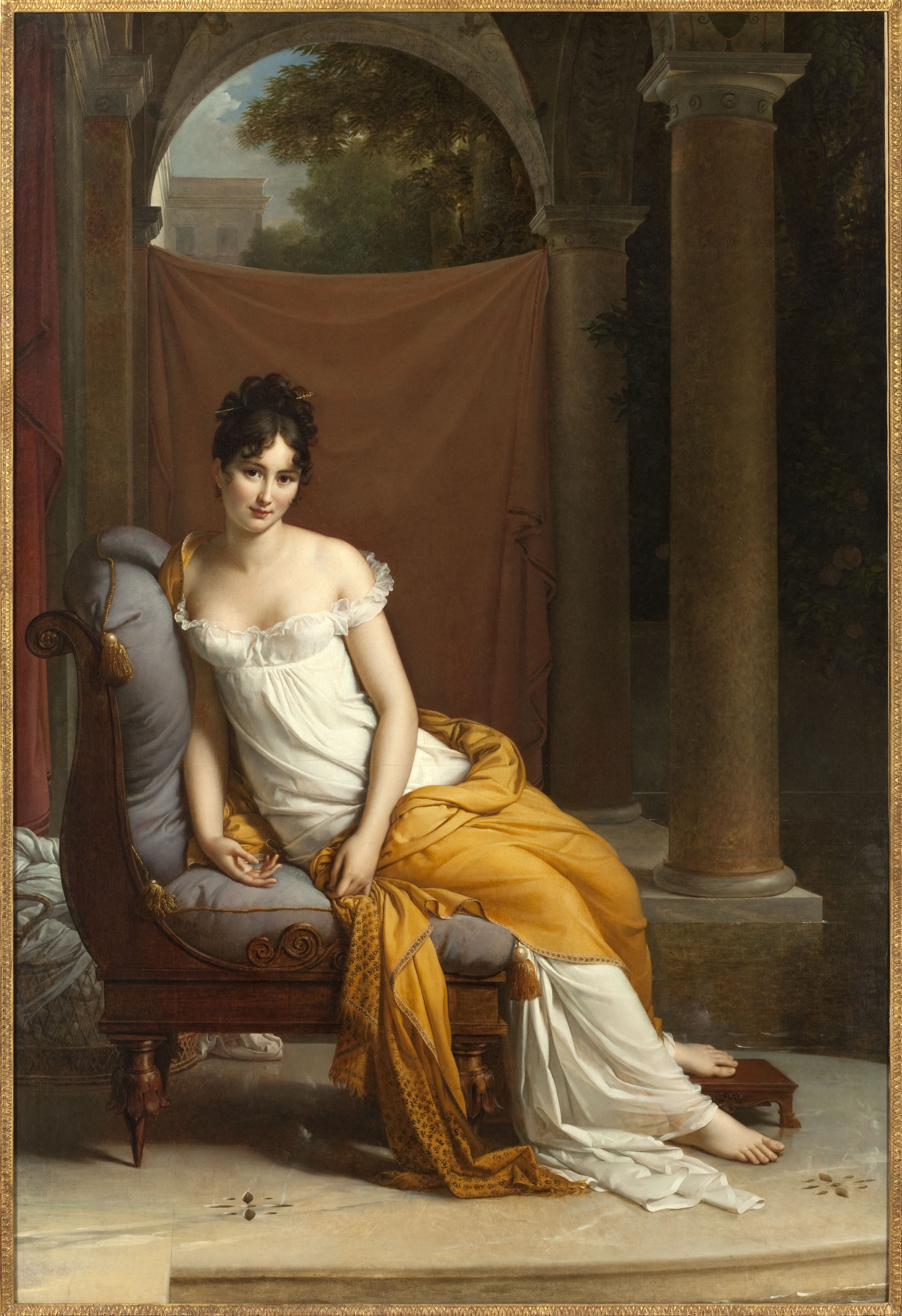
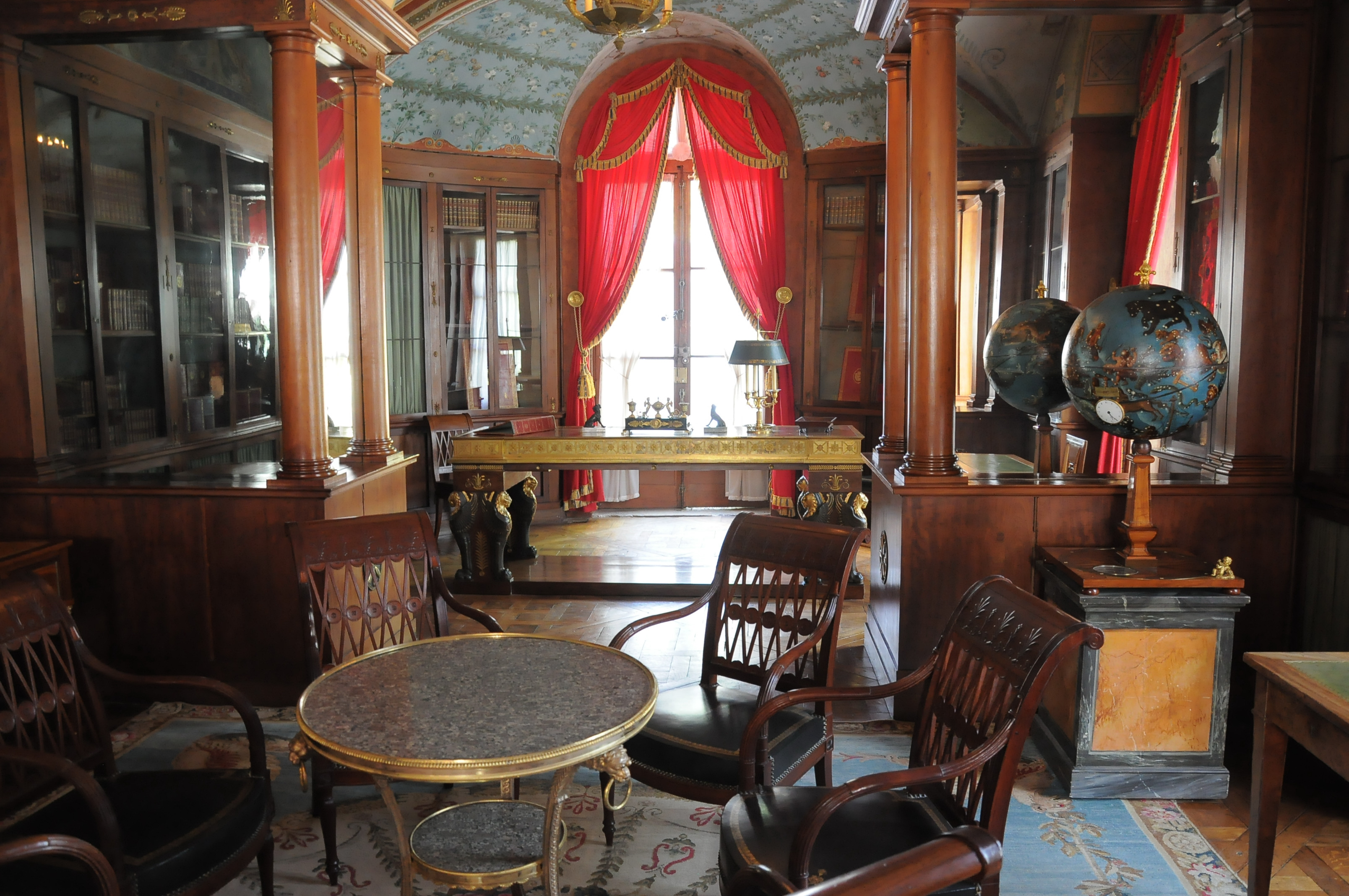
- Years active: c. 1760–1830
- Location: France

Neoclassicism is a movement in architecture, design and the arts which emerged in France in the 1740s and became dominant in France between about 1760 and 1830. It emerged as a reaction to the frivolity and excessive ornament of the baroque and rococo styles. In architecture it featured sobriety, straight lines, and forms, such as the pediment and colonnade, based on Ancient Greek and Roman models. In painting it featured heroism and sacrifice in the time of the ancient Romans and Greeks. It began late in the reign of Louis XV, became dominant under Louis XVI, and continued through the French Revolution, the French Directory, and the reign of Napoleon Bonaparte, and the Bourbon Restoration until 1830, when it was gradually replaced as the dominant style by romanticism and eclecticism.

Prominent architects of the style included Ange-Jacques Gabriel (1698–1782), Jacques-Germain Soufflot (1713–1780), Claude-Nicolas Ledoux (1736–1806) and Jean-François Chalgrin (1739–1811); painters included Jacques-Louis David (1748–1825) and his pupil, Jean-Auguste-Dominique Ingres (1780–1867).

== History ==
Neoclassicism in France emerged in the early to mid-18th century, inspired in part by the reports of the archeological excavations at Herculaneum (1738) and especially Pompeii (1748), which brought to light classical designs and paintings. The news of these discoveries, accompanied by engraved illustrations, circulated widely. The French antiquarian, art collector and amateur archeologist Anne Claude de Caylus travelled in Europe and the Mideast, and described what he had seen in Recueil d'antiquités, published with illustrations in 1755.

In the 1740s, the style began to slowly change; decoration became less extravagant and more discreet. In 1754 the brother of Madame de Pompadour, the Marquis de Marigny, accompanied the designer Nicolas Cochin and a delegation of artists and scholars to Italy to see the recent discoveries at Pompeii and Herculaneum, and made a grand tour of other classical monuments. They returned full of enthusiasm for a new classical style, based on the Roman and Greek monuments. In 1754 they published a manifesto against the Rocaille style, calling for a return to classicism. Marigny, after the death of Louis XV, later became director of buildings for Louis XVI.

The style was given a philosophical appeal by the philosophes, including Denis Diderot and Jean-Jacques Rousseau, who called for a restoration of moral values in society, and by the Abbé Marc-Antoine Laugier, who wrote L'essai sur l'architecture, a call for a return to pure and uncluttered forms of architecture. The archeological sites in Greece and Italy became mandatory stops for aristocratic and scholarly visitors on the Grand Tour of Europe. The best young painters in France competed for scholarships to the French Academy in Rome. Ingres studied there, and later became its director. In 1757 the Belgian architect Jean-François de Neufforge published Recueil élémentaire d'architecture, an illustrated textbook of the style. The new taste was originally called le goût grec (the Greek taste). It called for geometric forms and decoration in "the sober and majestic style of the architects of ancient Greece."

In the last years of the reign of Louis XV and throughout the reign of Louis XVI, the new style appeared in the royal residences, particularly in the salons and furnishings of the Dauphine and then Queen Marie Antoinette, and of the Paris aristocracy. It combined Greek, Roman, and what was loosely called "Etruscan" styles with arabesques and grotesques borrowed from Raphael and the Renaissance, and with chinoiserie and Turkish themes, Between 1780 and 1792, the style also appeared in architecture, in classically buildings including the Petit Trianon in Versailles and the Château de Bagatelle (1777). It also appeared in other art forms, including in particular the paintings of Jacques-Louis David, especially the Oath of the Horatii (1784).

== Architecture ==
=== Louis XIV, Louis XV and Louis XVI ===
Classicism appeared in French architecture during the reign of Louis XIV. In 1667 the king rejected a baroque scheme for the new east façade of the Louvre by Gian Lorenzo Bernini, the most famous architect and sculptor of the Baroque era, in favor of a more sober composition with pediments and an elevated colonnade of coupled colossal Corinthian columns, devised by a committee, consisting of Louis Le Vau, Charles Le Brun, and Claude Perrault. The result, incorporating elements of ancient Roman, French, and Italian architecture, "resolves itself into the greatest palace façade in Europe."

Under Louis XIV, the Roman dome and façade of monumental columns became the dominant features of important new churches, beginning with the chapel of Val-de-Grâce (1645–1710), by Jules Hardouin-Mansart, Jacques Lemercier and Pierre Le Muet, followed by the church of Les Invalides (1680–1706). While the basic features of the architecture of these churches were classical, the interiors were lavishly decorated in the baroque style.

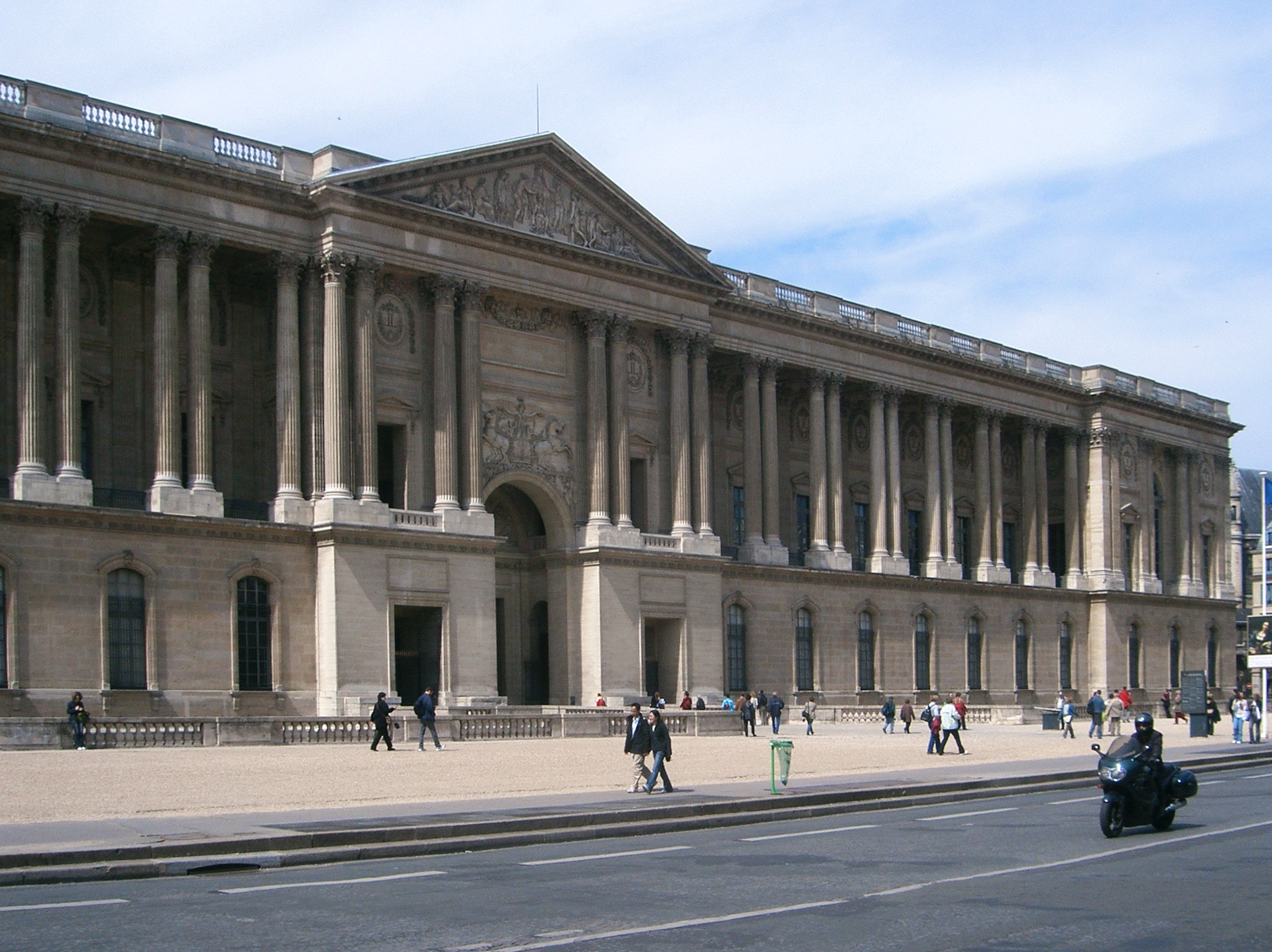
The east façade of the Louvre by Louis Le Vau, Charles Le Brun, and Claude Perrault (1667-1670)

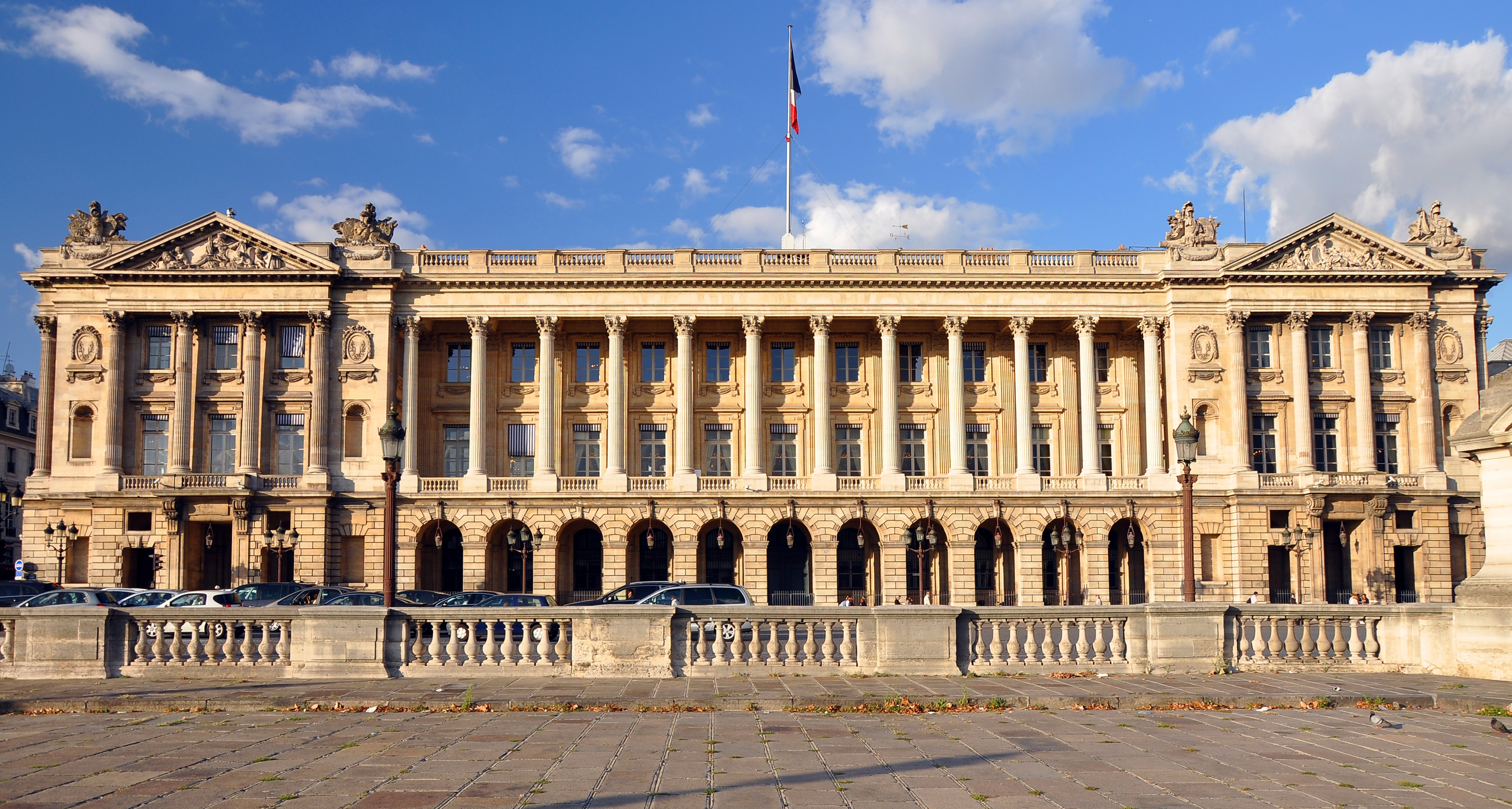
Hôtel de la Marine on the Place de la Concorde (1761–70)

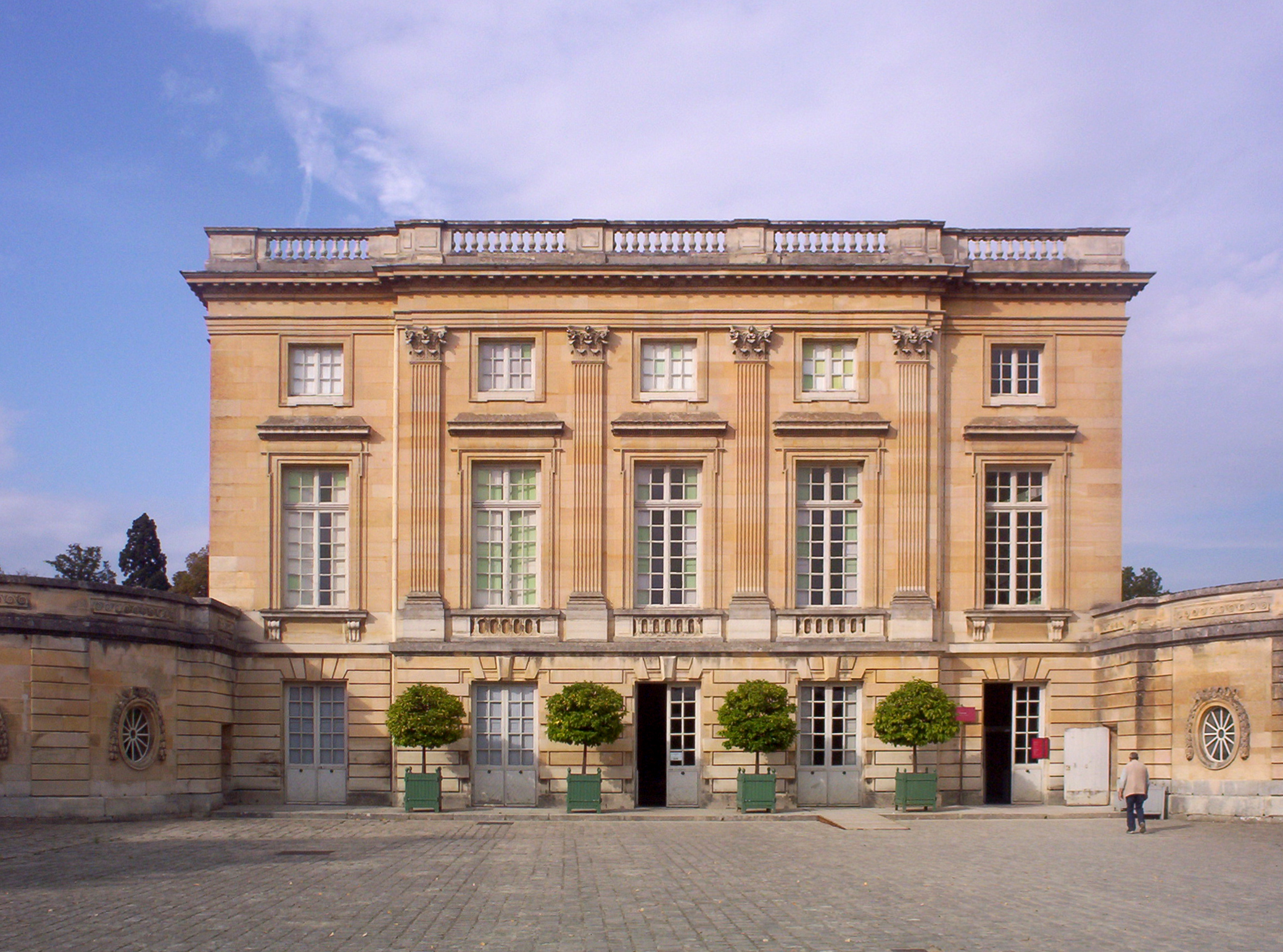
Petit Trianon (1764)

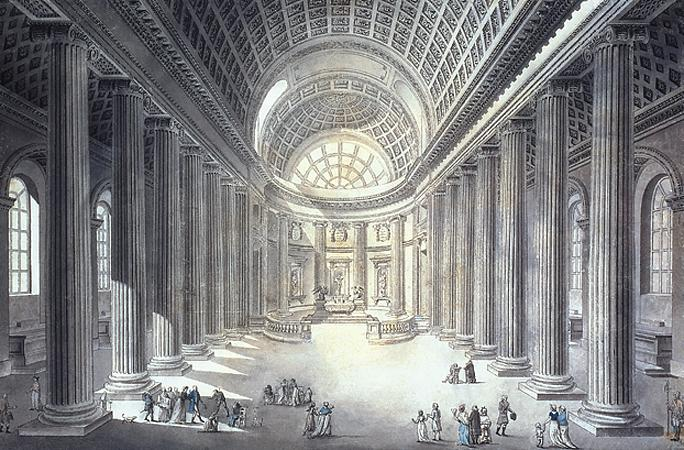
Interior of Église Saint-Philippe-du-Roule, Paris (1765–70)

In the latter part of the reign of Louis XV, the neoclassical became the dominant style in both civil and religious architecture. The chief architect of the king was Jacques Gabriel from 1734 until 1742, and then his more famous son, Ange-Jacques Gabriel until the end of the reign. His major works included the École Militaire, the ensemble of buildings overlooking the Place Louis XV (now Place de la Concorde (1761–1770) and the Petit Trianon at Versailles (1764). Over the course of the reign of Louis XV, while interiors were lavishly decorated, the façades gradually became simpler, less ornamented and more classical. The façades Gabriel designed were carefully rhymed and balanced by rows of windows and columns, and, on large buildings like those the Place de la Concorde, often featured grand arcades on the street level, and classical pediments or balustrades on the roofline. Ornamental features sometimes included curving wrought-iron balconies with undulating rocaille designs, similar to the rocaille decoration of the interiors.

The religious architecture of the period was also sober and monumental and tended, at the end of the reign, toward neo-classical; major examples include the Church of Sainte-Genevieve (now the Panthéon), built from 1758 to 1790 to a design by Jacques-Germain Soufflot, and Church of Saint-Philippe-du-Roule (1765–1777) by Jean-François Chalgrin, which featured an enormous barrel-vaulted nave.

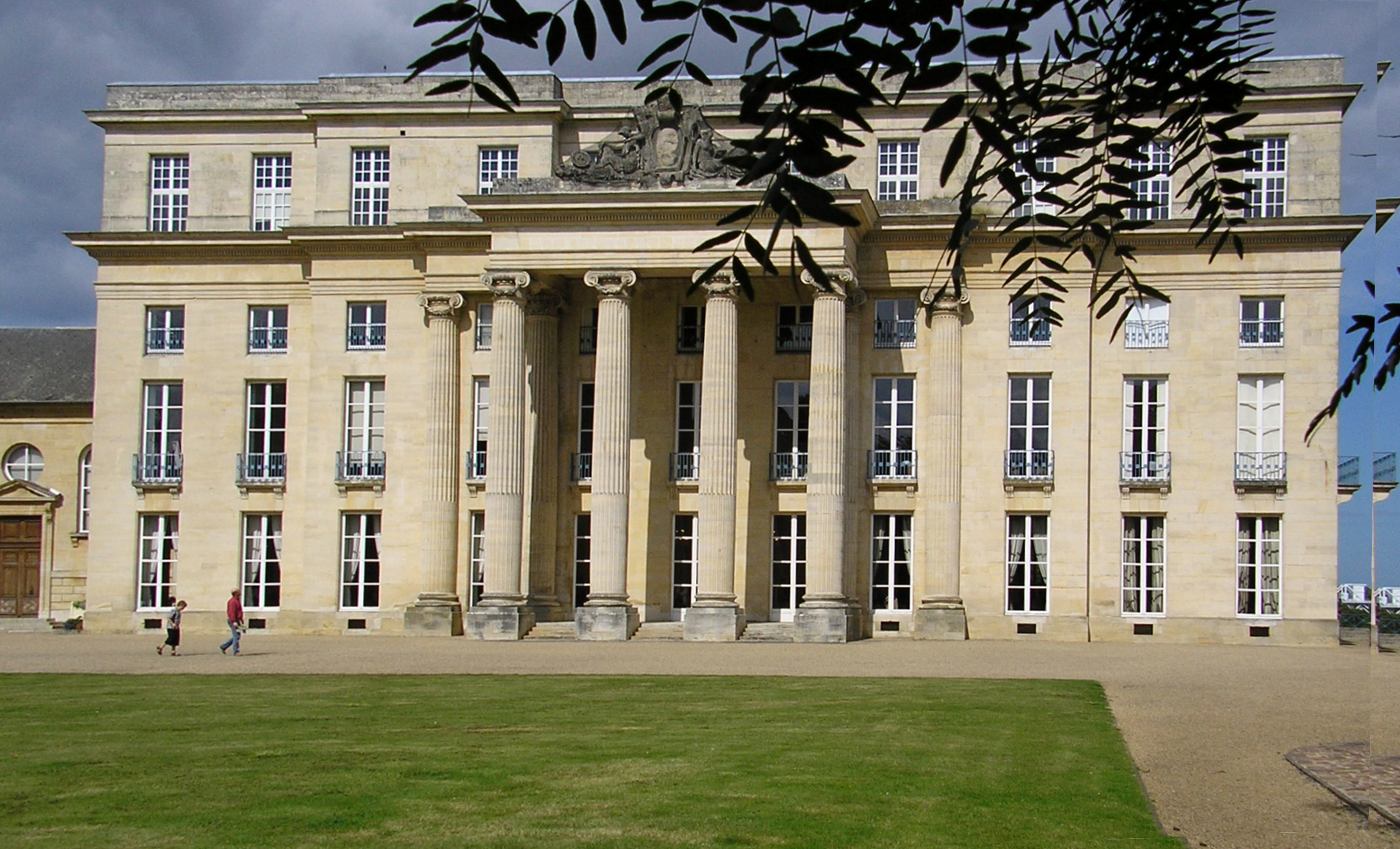
Château de Bénouville by Claude-Nicolas Ledoux (1770-1780)

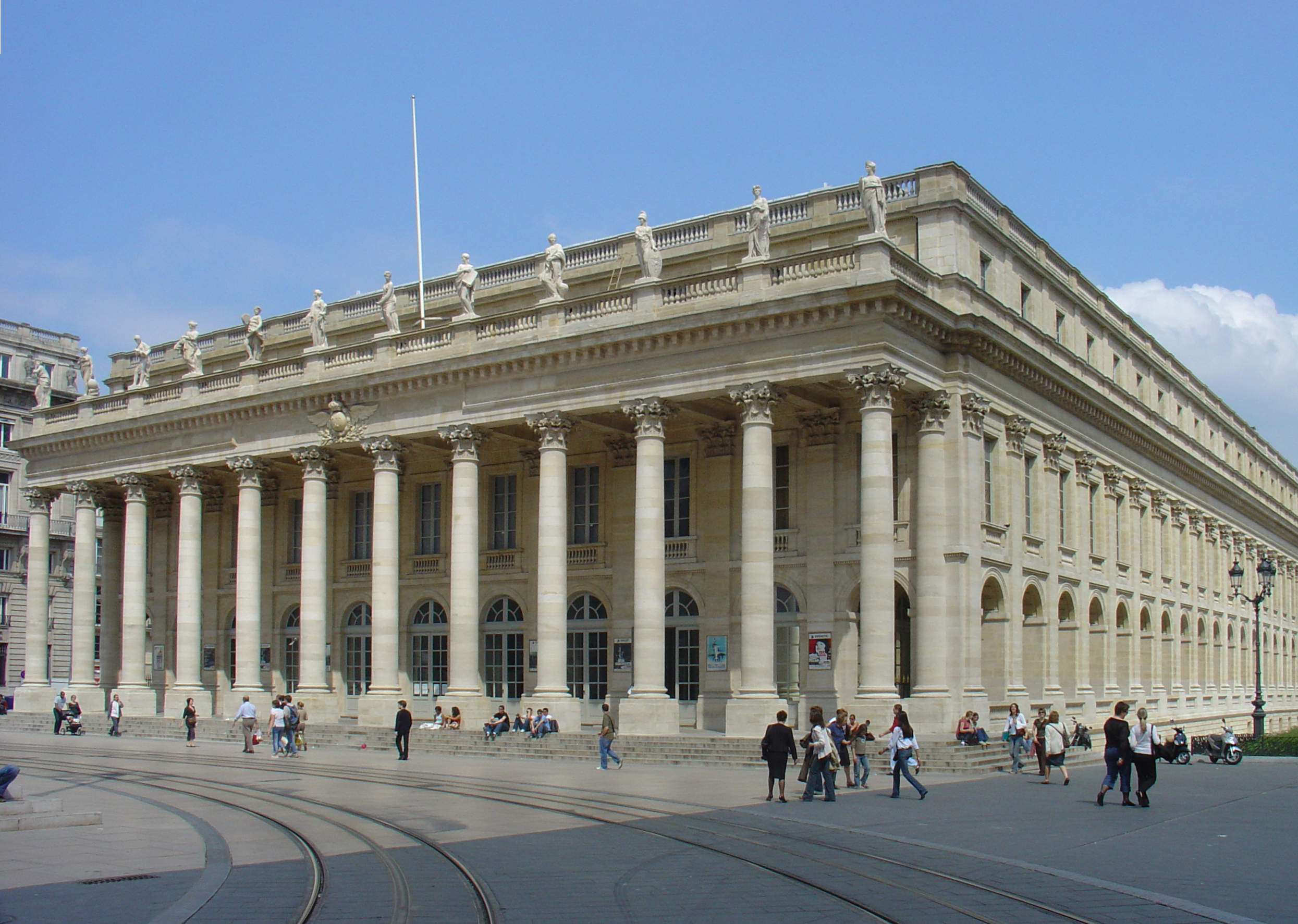
Grand Théâtre de Bordeaux by Victor Louis (1780)

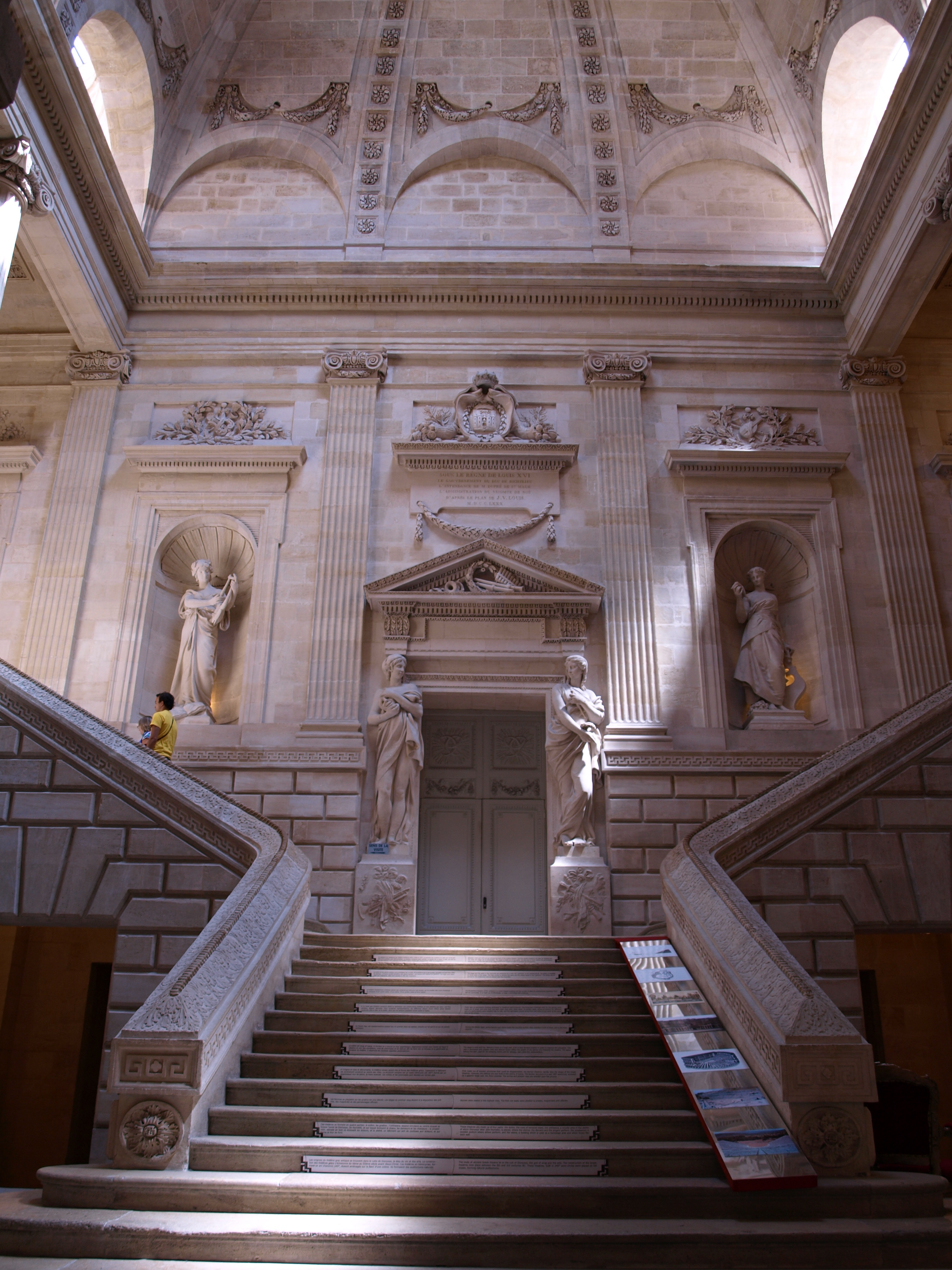
Stairway of the Grand Théâtre de Bordeaux, Victor Louis (1780)

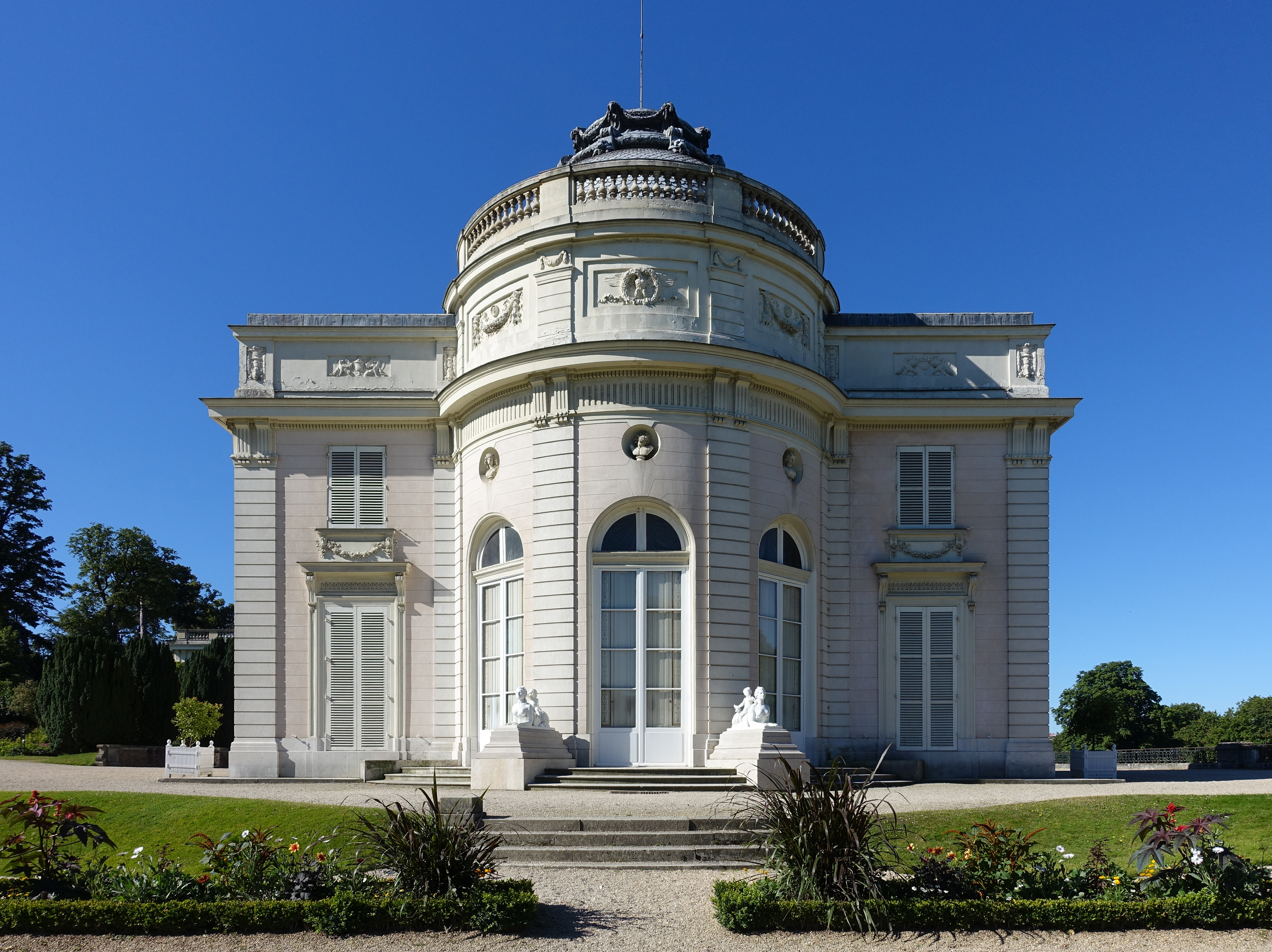
Château de Bagatelle by François-Joseph Bélanger (1777)

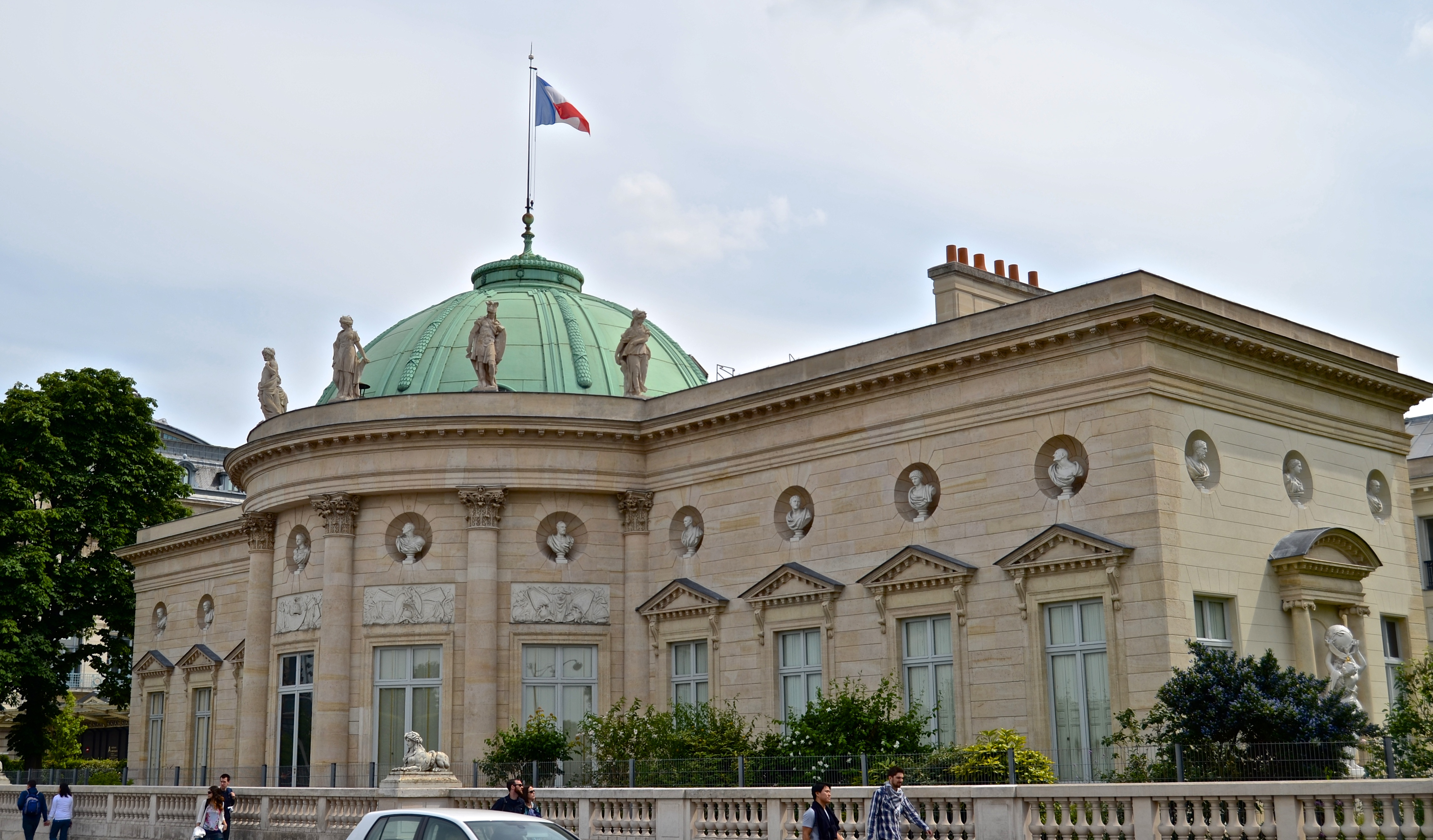
Hôtel de Salm, Paris, by Pierre Rousseau (1751-1810)

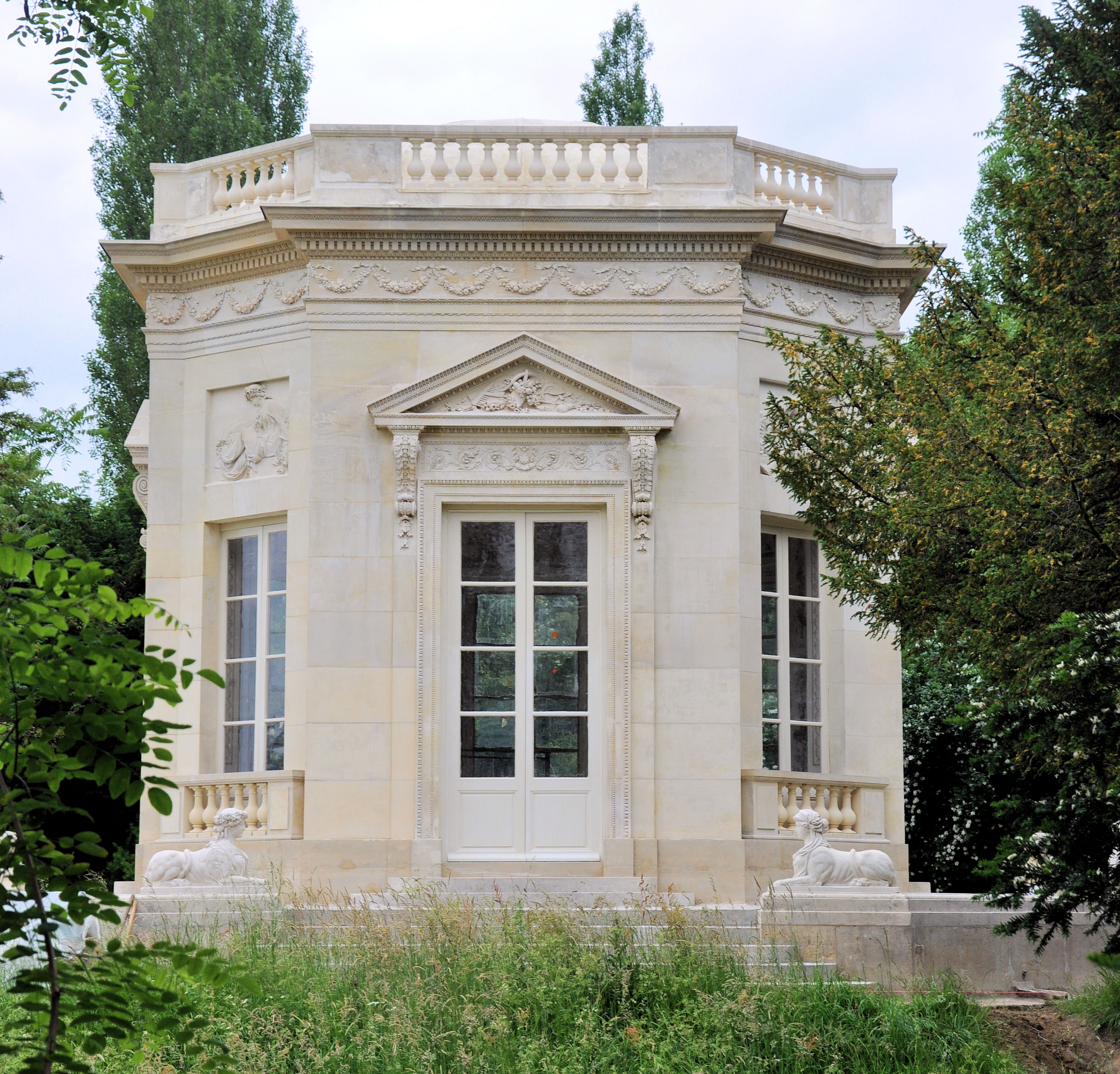
Belvedere of the Petit Trianon at Versailles by Richard Mique (1789)

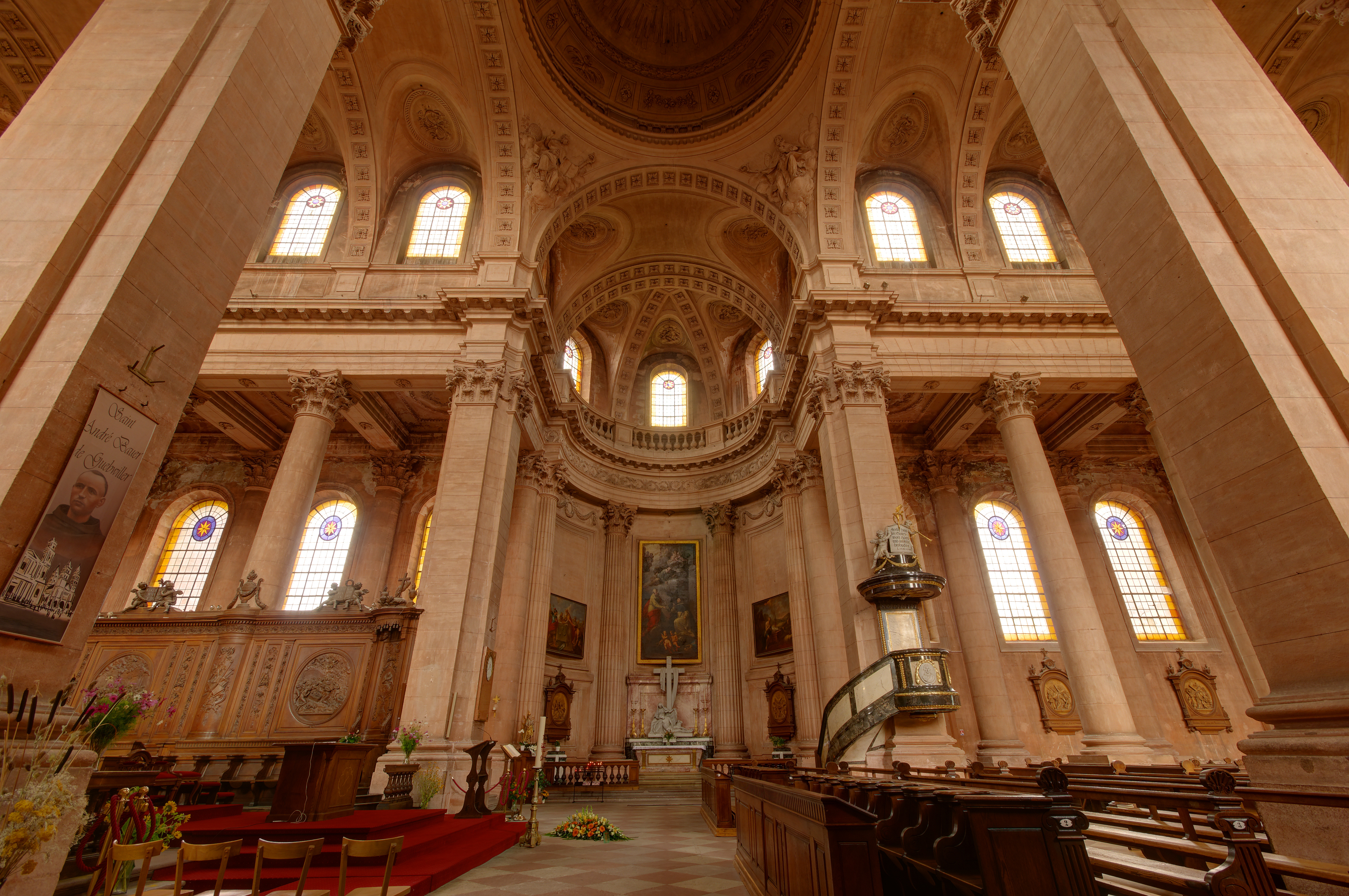
Transept of Notre-Dame de Guebwiller (1762–1785)

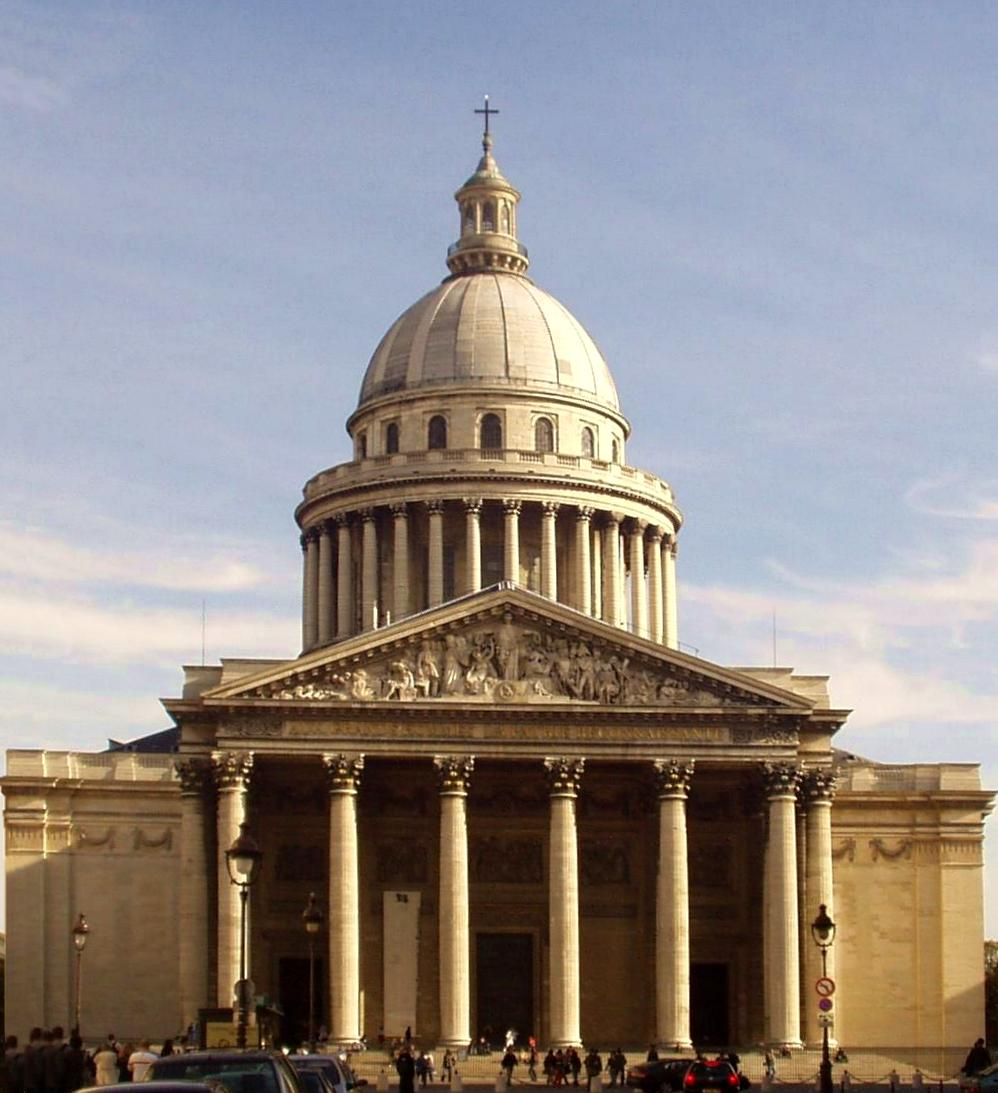
The Panthéon (1764-1790), by Jacques-Germain Soufflot

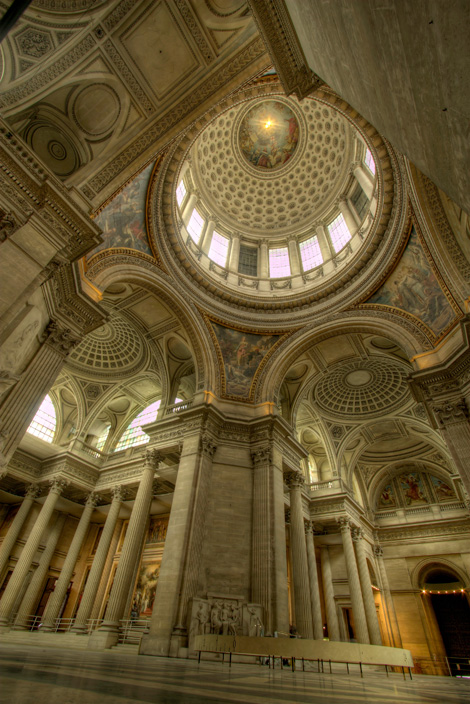
Interior of the Panthéon

During the reign of Louis XVI, neoclassical was the dominant architectural style in Paris and in the provinces. Notable examples include the Hôtel des Monnaies, Paris (1771–75) by Jacques Denis Antoine, as well as the Palais de Justice, Paris by the same architect; and the theater of Besançon (1775) and the Château de Bénouville in the Calvados, both by Claude-Nicolas Ledoux. The École de Chirurgie, or School of Surgery in Paris by Jacques Gondoin (1769) adapted the forms of the neoclassical town house, with a court of honor placed between a pavilion with a colonnade on the street and the main building. He also added a peristyle and another floor above the columns, and transformed the entrance to the courtyard into a miniature triumphal arch.

The new theaters in Paris and Bordeaux were prominent examples of the new style. The architect Victor Louis (1731–1811) completed the Grand Théâtre de Bordeaux (1780); its majestic stairway was a forerunner of the stairway of the Paris Opera Garnier. In 1791, in the midst of the French Revolution, he completed the Salle Richelieu. The Odeon Theater in Paris (1779–1782) was built by Marie-Joseph Peyre (1730–1785) and Charles de Wailly (1729–1798). It featured a portico in the form of a covered gallery and columns in advance of the façade.

One of the best-known neoclassical buildings of the period is the Château de Bagatelle (1777), designed and built by François-Joseph Bélanger for the Comte d'Artois, Louis XVI's brother. The small château was designed and completed in just sixty-three days, to win a bet with Marie Antoinette that he could build a château in less than three months. Marie-Antoinette had a similar small neoclassical belvedere created by architect Richard Mique, who had also designed her picturesque rustic village in the gardens of Versailles. It was completed in 1789, the year of the French Revolution.

Another notable example of the neoclassical style in Paris is the Hôtel de Salm (now the Palais de la Légion d'Honneur), built by Pierre Rousseau in 1751–1783. The façade is distinguished by its simplicity and purity, and its harmony and balance. A colonnade of Corinthian columns supports the entablature of the rotunda, which is surmounted by statues. The façade is also animated by busts of Roman emperors in niches, and sculptures in relief above the windows of the semicircular central avant-corps.

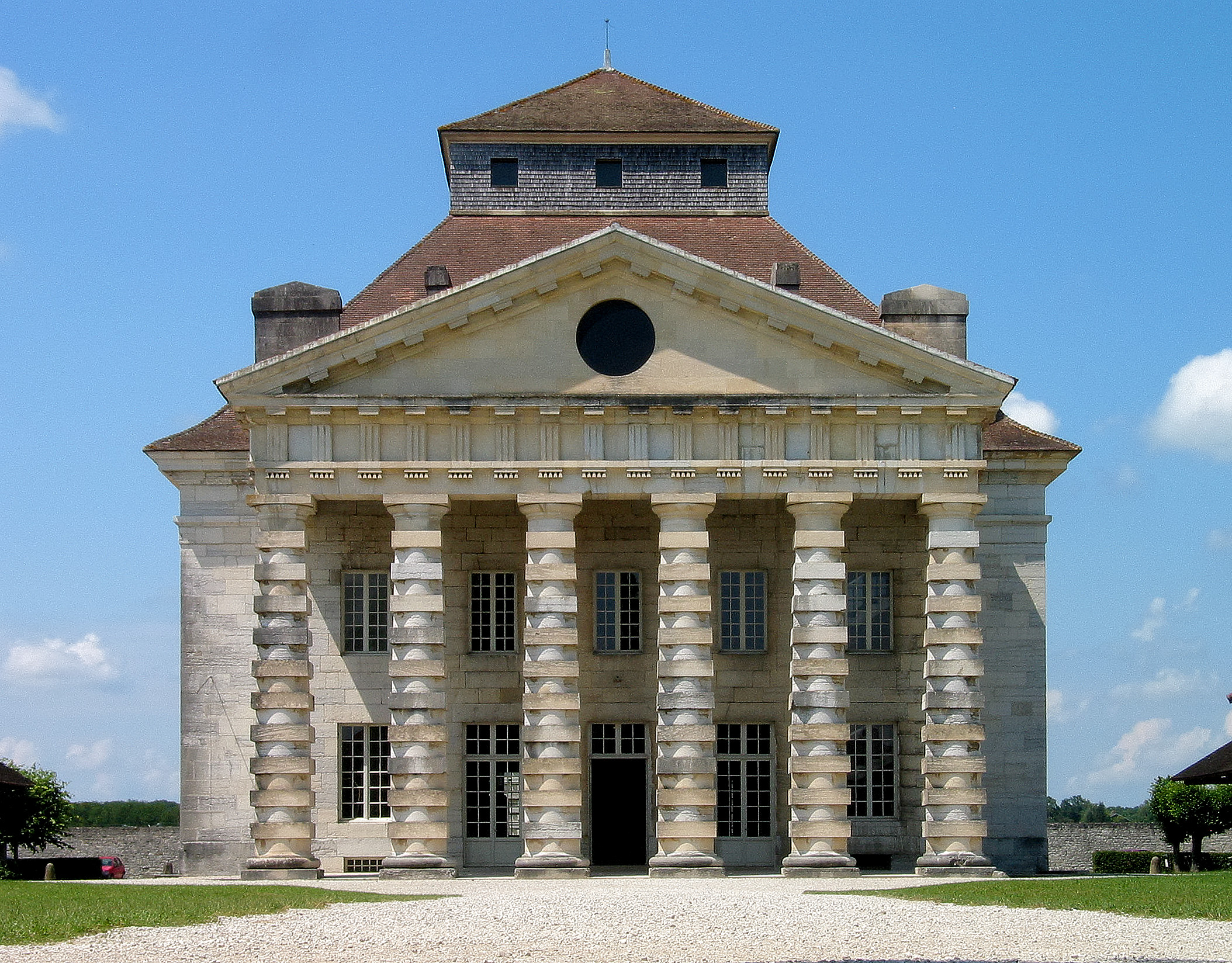
Director's house at the Royal Saltworks at Arc-et-Senans by Claude-Nicolas Ledoux (1775–79)

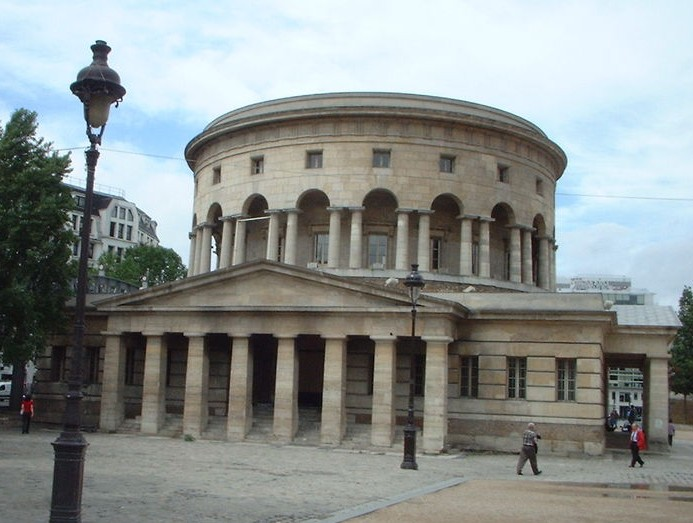
Rotonde de la Villette by Claude-Nicolas Ledoux (1785–89)

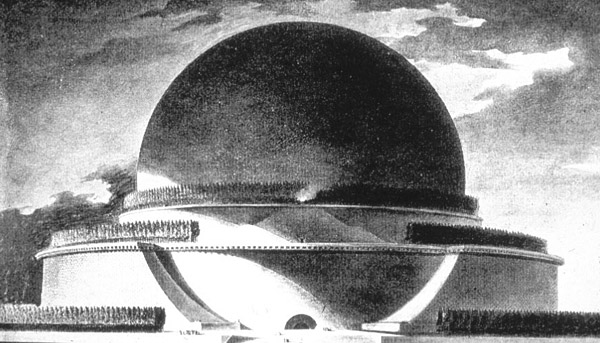
Project for a monument to Isaac Newton by Étienne-Louis Boullée (1784)

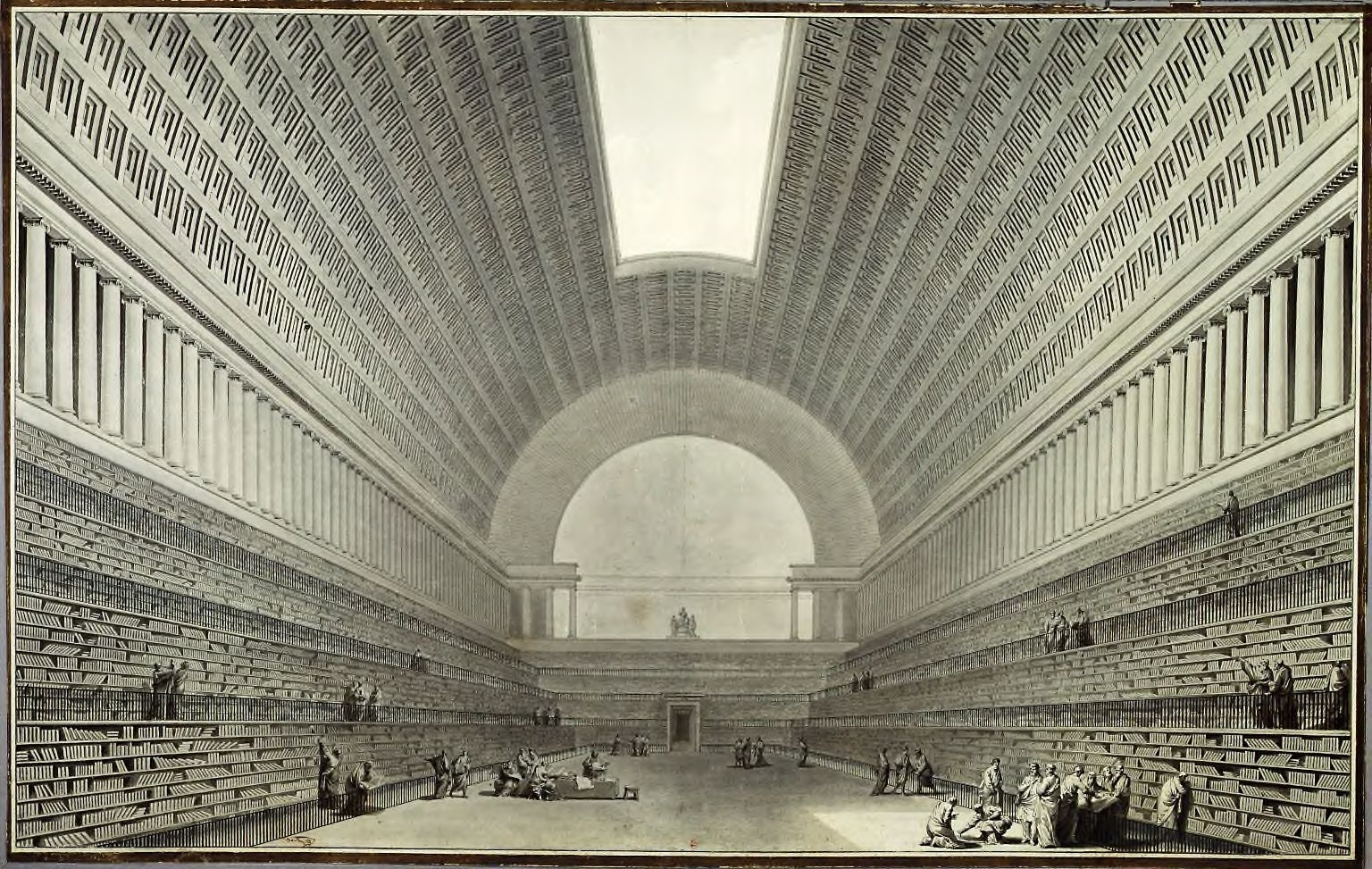
Project for the Royal Library by Étienne-Louis Boullée (1785)

A few architects adapted the neoclassical style to more functional purposes. Claude-Nicolas Ledoux designed the Royal Saltworks at Arc-et-Senans with exaggerated neoclassical buildings arranged in circles around a central "temple", where the director's home and office was placed. He also designed several rotundas for the new customs barriers installed around Paris between 1785–89. These barriers became highly unpopular (due to the taxes, not the architecture) and most were destroyed during the Revolution, though those at Parc de la Villette and Parc Monceau still stand.

The most visionary French neoclassical architect was certainly Étienne-Louis Boullée. His designs for an immense spherical monument to Isaac Newton (1784) and a vast new royal library in Paris in the form of a giant barrel vault (1785) were never seriously considered, but foreshadowed the architecture of the 20th century.

=== Revolution, Directorate and Empire ===
During the French Revolution construction virtually stopped in Paris. The aristocrats fled, churches were closed and sacked. The one large project carried out between 1795 and 1797 was the building of a large new chamber within the Palais Bourbon, which eventually became the home of the French National Assembly. The École des Beaux-Arts was re-organized and reconstituted, with the architecture department under Quatremère de Quincy (1755–1849). De Quincy was an amateur archeologist and a classical scholar, as well as an architect. He was sentenced to death by a revolutionary court in 1793, but was spared by the fall of Maximilien Robespierre. He was charged with the conversion of the Church of Sainte-Genevieve into the modern Panthéon, and assured that architectural studies taught the classical traditions.

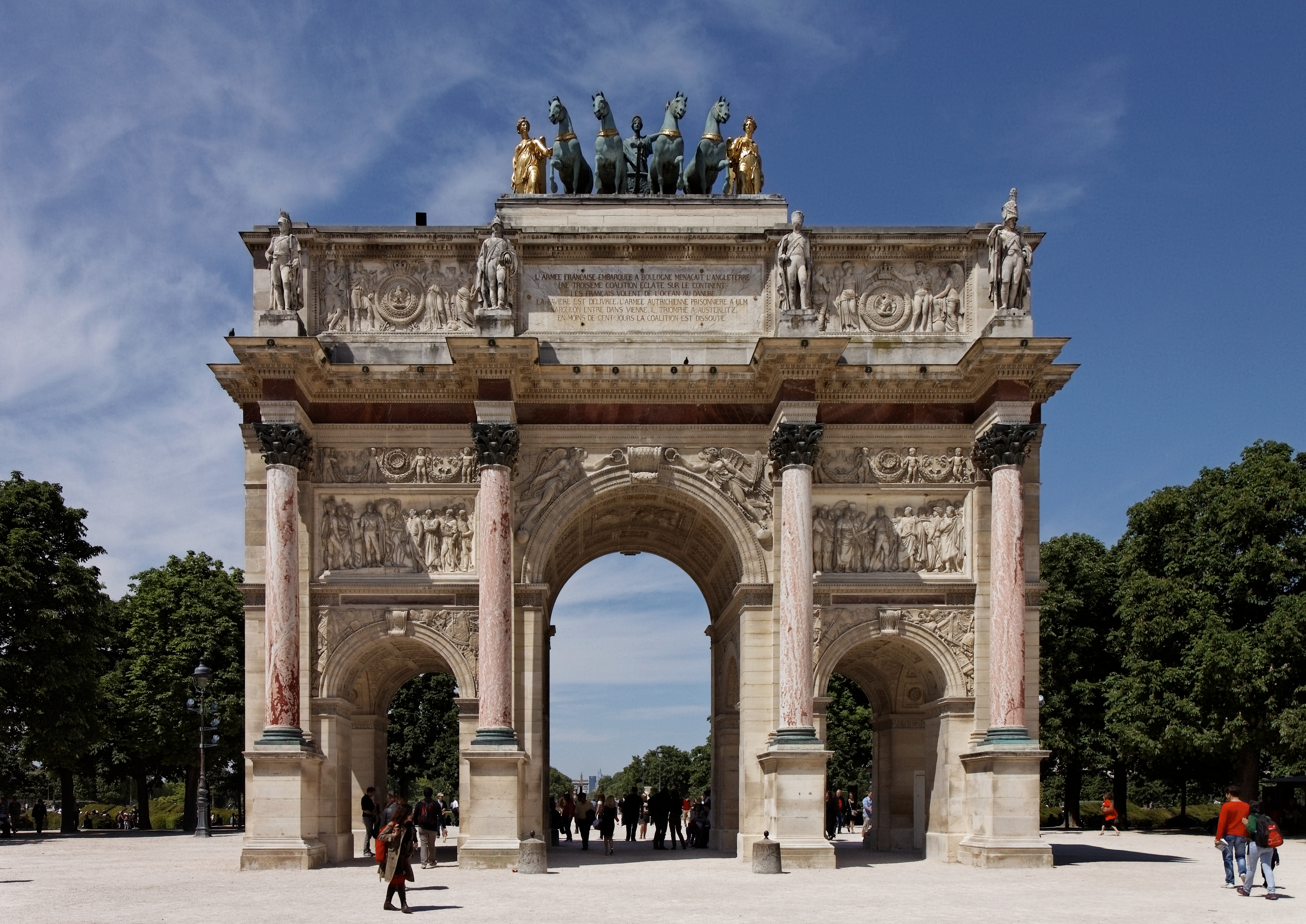
Arc de Triomphe du Carrousel by Pierre-François-Léonard Fontaine (1806–08)

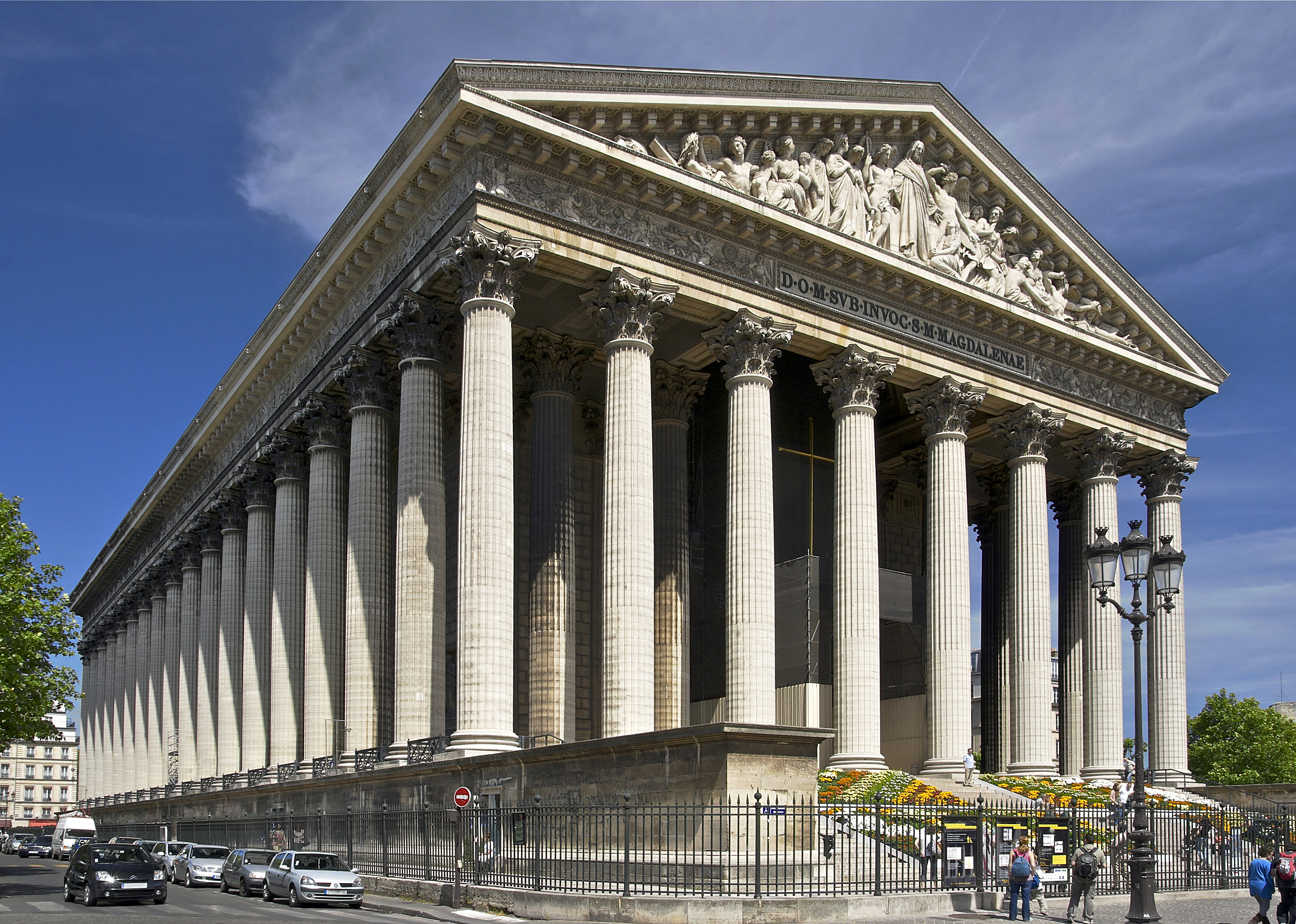
Church of the Madeleine facade by Pierre-Alexandre Vignon (1807–43)

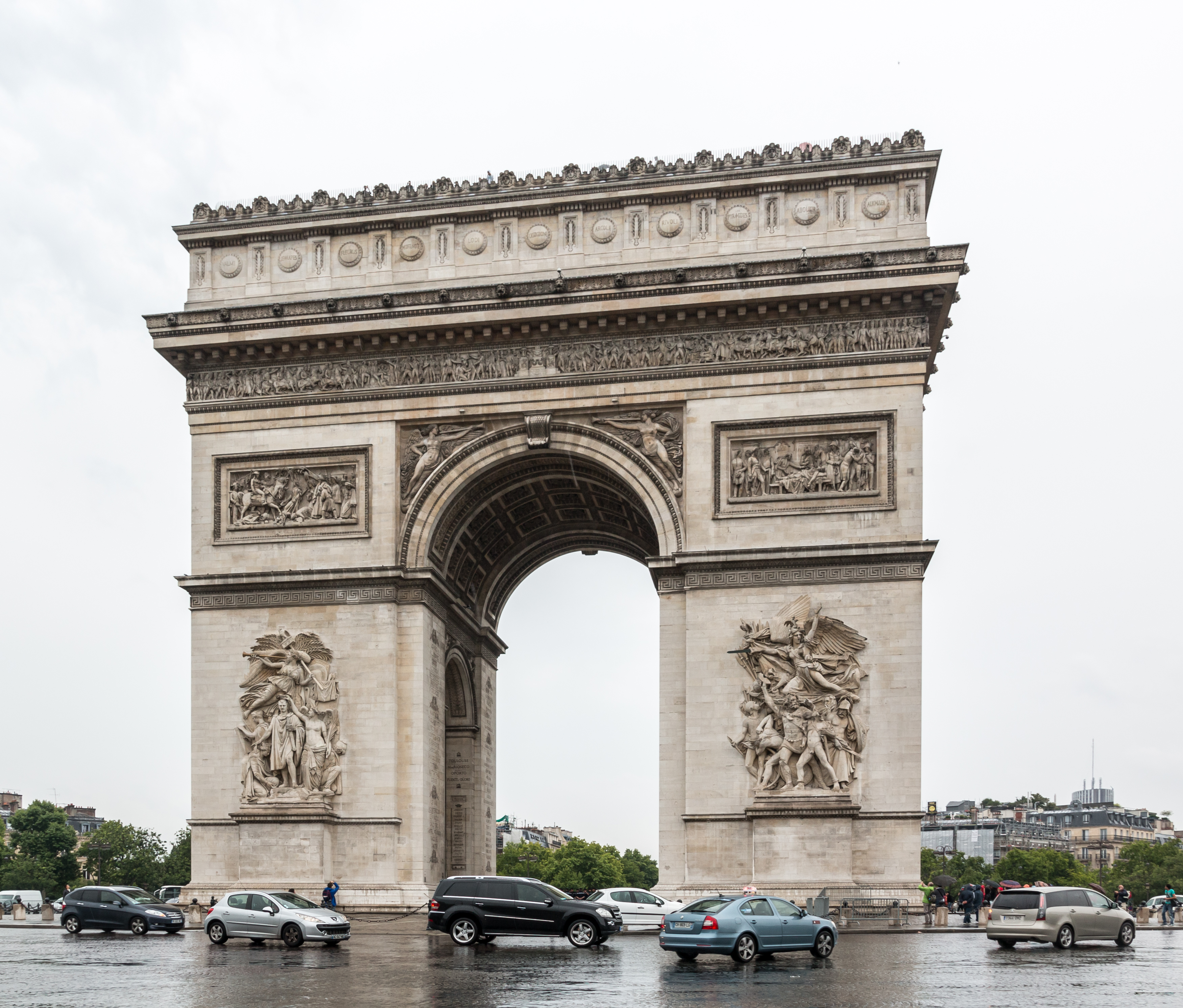
Arc de Triomphe by Jean-François Chalgrin (1808-1838)

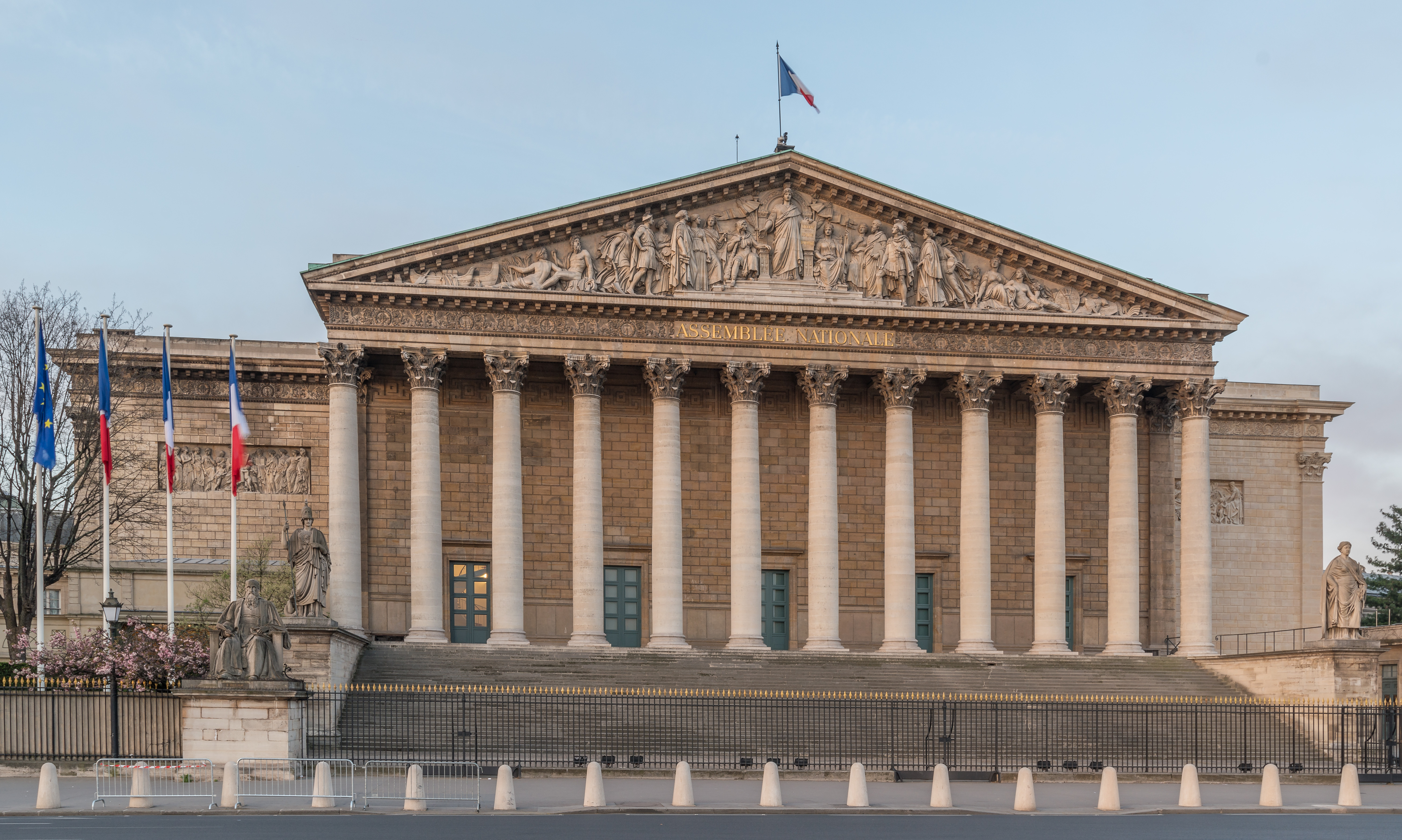
Facade of the Palais Bourbon, added by Napoleon in 1808

After Napoleon Bonaparte came to power, the most influential architects were Charles Percier (1764–1838) and Pierre-François-Léonard Fontaine (1762–1853). Their grand projects for Napoleon included the Rue de Rivoli, with its uniform neoclassical façades, modeled on the squares built by Louis XIV and Louis XV. They also designed the interior of the Château de Malmaison, the residence of Empress Joséphine de Beauharnais, into the model of the neoclassical style. (1803) Fontaine designed another Napoleonic landmark, the Arc de Triomphe du Carrousel (1806–1808) in the courtyard of the Louvre Palace.

Other Napoleonic neoclassical projects included the grand stairway of the Luxembourg Palace (1801) by Jean-François Chalgrin (1801), and the Arc de Triomphe (begun by Chalgrin in 1808, but not finished until 1836). Pierre-Alexandre Vignon (1763–1828), a student of Ledoux, was charged with remaking the Church of the Madeleine, begun in 1761 but abandoned during the Revolution, into a "Temple of Glory" dedicated to Napoleon's army. This project was abandoned in 1813 after a series of defeats; it became a church again, but was not completed until 1843. Napoleon also added a neoclassical façade with twelve Corinthian columns to the facade of the Palais Bourbon. It was in an entirely different style than the palace behind it, and was not aligned with it; it was aligned instead with the new Temple of Glory which he was building, facing it, on the far side of the Place de la Concorde.

=== The Restoration and arrival of romanticism ===
After the final defeat of Napoleon in 1815, the neoclassic style continued to be used during the French Restoration, particularly in Paris churches. Examples include Notre-Dame-de-Lorette (1823–36) by Louis-Hippolyte Lebas and Saint-Vincent-de-Paul by Jacques-Ignace Hittorff (1824–44). By the 1830s, the architectural style was succeeded by Baroque Revival and Beaux-Arts architecture.

A change of style began to appear early in the 19th century, particularly after the publication in 1802 of le Génie du christianisme by one of the leading figures of French romanticism, François-René de Chateaubriand (1768–1848). He appealed for a return to the Gothic style, which, as the style of the great cathedrals, he considered was the only truly great French style. The movement toward romanticism and gothic was accelerated by the publication of the hugely successful novel The Hunchback of Notre-Dame by Victor Hugo in 1831, and then the program of restoration of French Gothic monuments led by Prosper Mérimée and conducted by Eugène Viollet-le-Duc (1814–1879). This, along with the July Revolution of 1830, brought to a close the era of French neoclassicism.

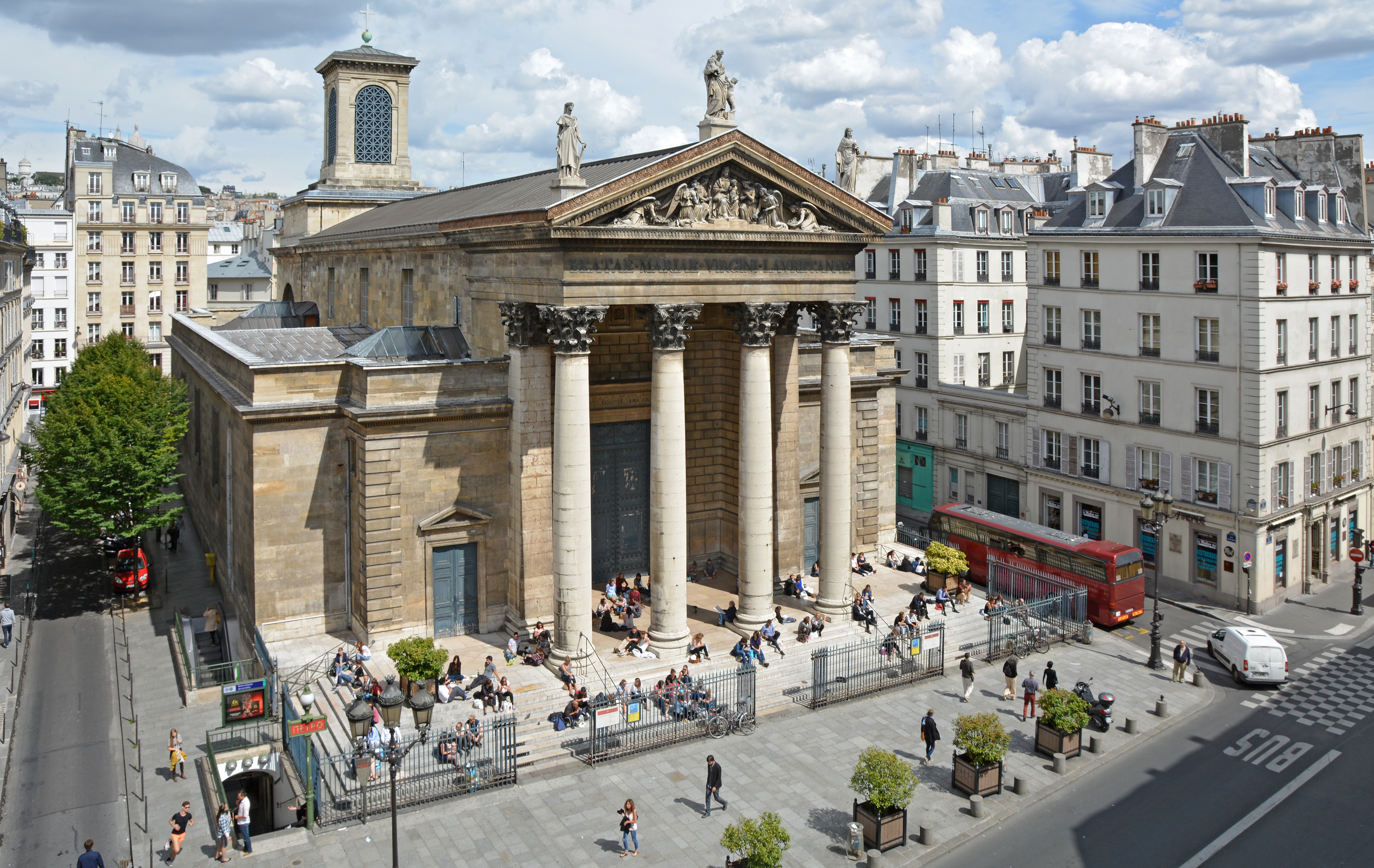
Notre-Dame-de-Lorette (1823–26) by Louis-Hippolyte Lebas

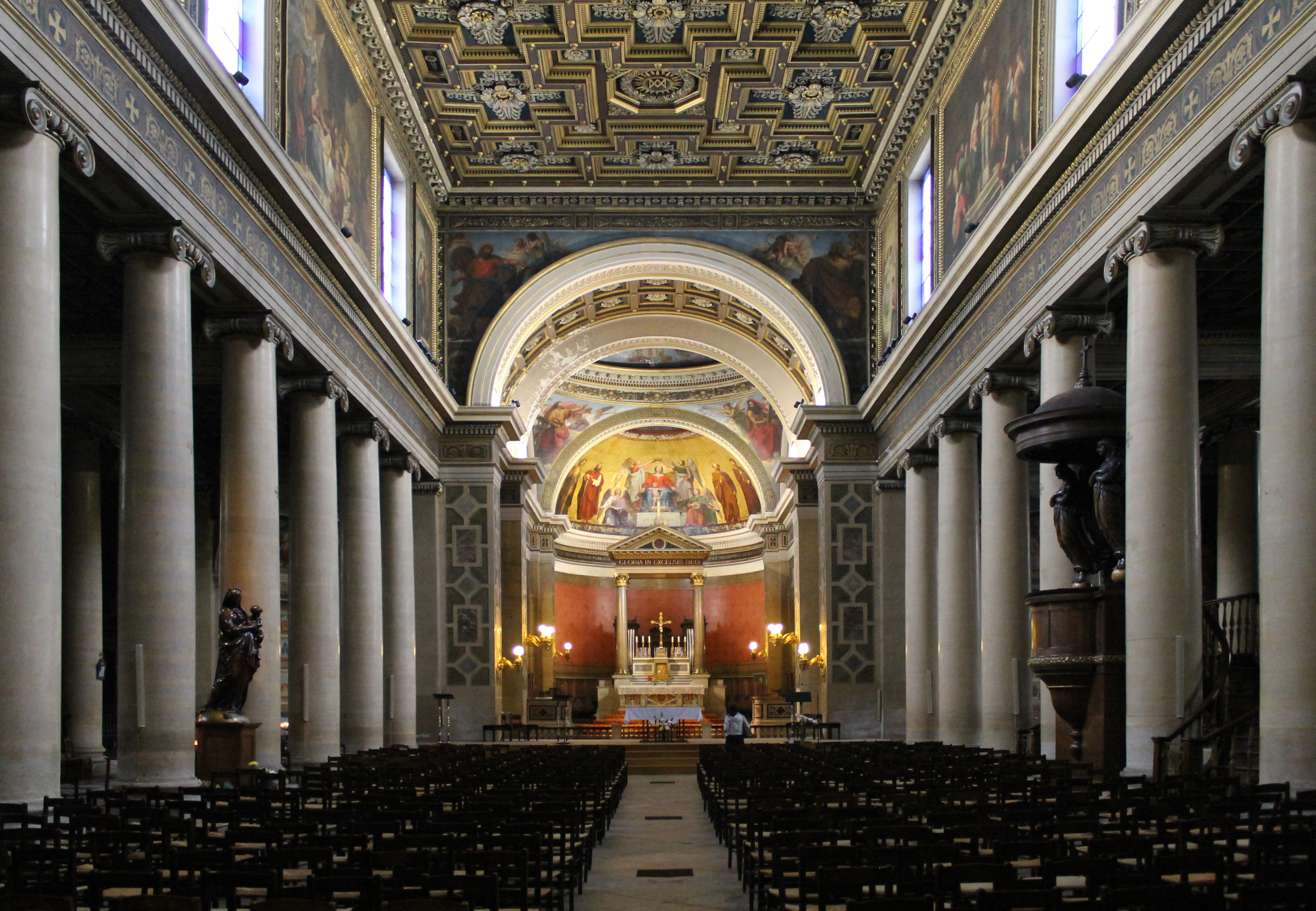
Interior of Notre-Dame-de-Lorette

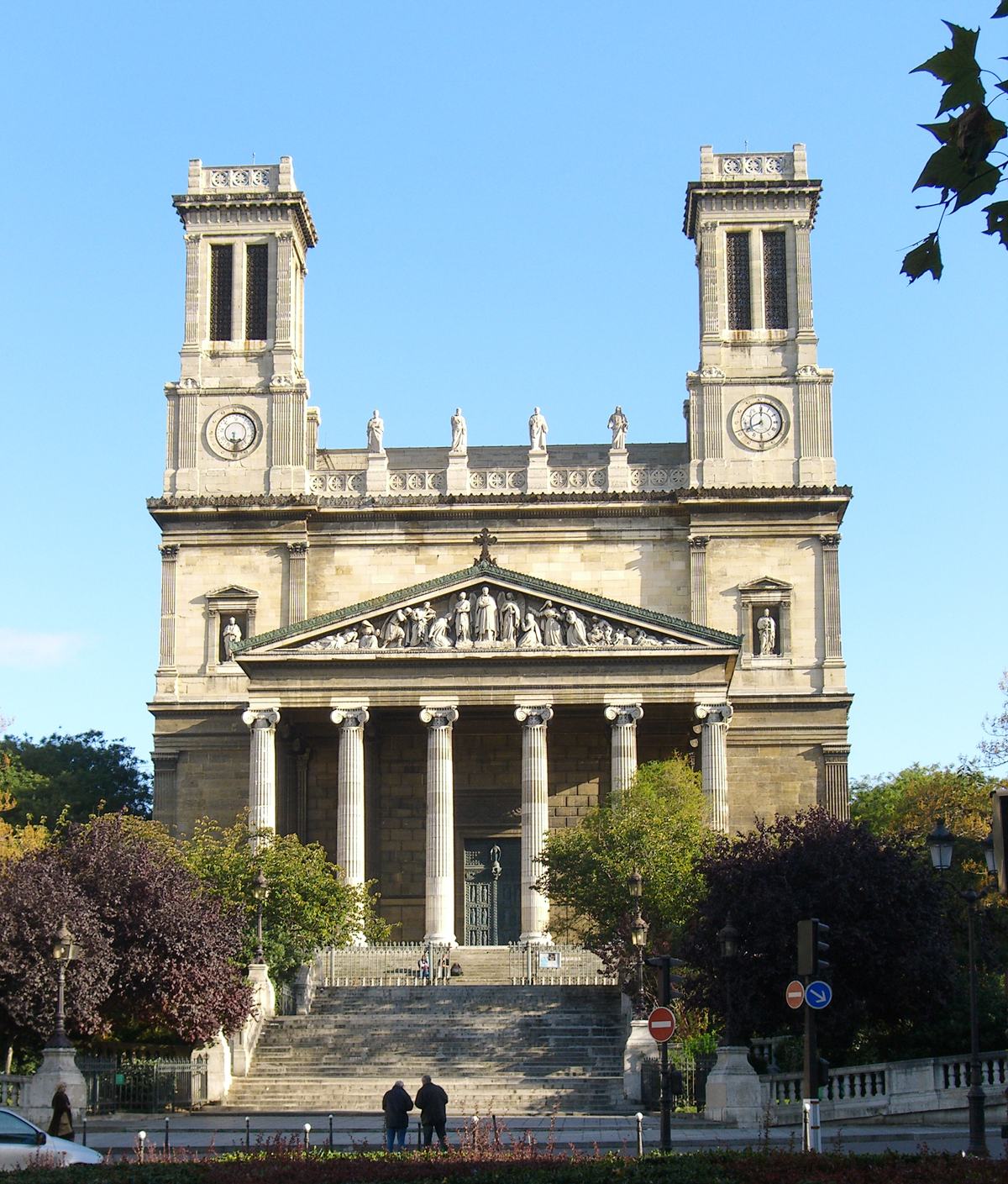
Saint-Vincent-de-Paul by Jacques-Ignace Hittorff (1824–44)

== Painting ==
The dominant figure in French neoclassical painting, even before the Revolution, was Jacques Louis David (1748–1825). He began as a classical and religious painter, an admirer of Jean-Baptiste Greuze, the history and genre painter. He was recommended to the Académie royale de peinture et de sculpture by a family friend, François Boucher, master of the rococo style. He won the prestigious Prix de Rome and went to study there in 1775. He discovered the treasures excavated from Pompeii and other ancient sites, and entirely changed his style. Beginning in 1784 he painted works based on stories from classical literature, including Oath of the Horatii (1781), a celebration of duty and sacrifice in Roman times. When the French Revolution began in 1789, David became an active participant in the most extreme wing, the Jacobins, He supported the dissolution of the Royal Academy of Painting and Sculpture, and designed sets for revolutionary pageants and ceremonies. His most famous picture of the period, The Death of Marat (1793), adapted the facial expression and the limp arm of Christ in Michaelangelo's Pietà to depict the assassinated Jacobin leader, Jean Paul Marat. When the Jacobins fell in 1794, he was imprisoned twice for several months, but then resumed an active career as a portraitist and then as court painter for Napoleon Bonaparte. When Napoleon fell and the monarchy was restored, he went into exile in Belgium.

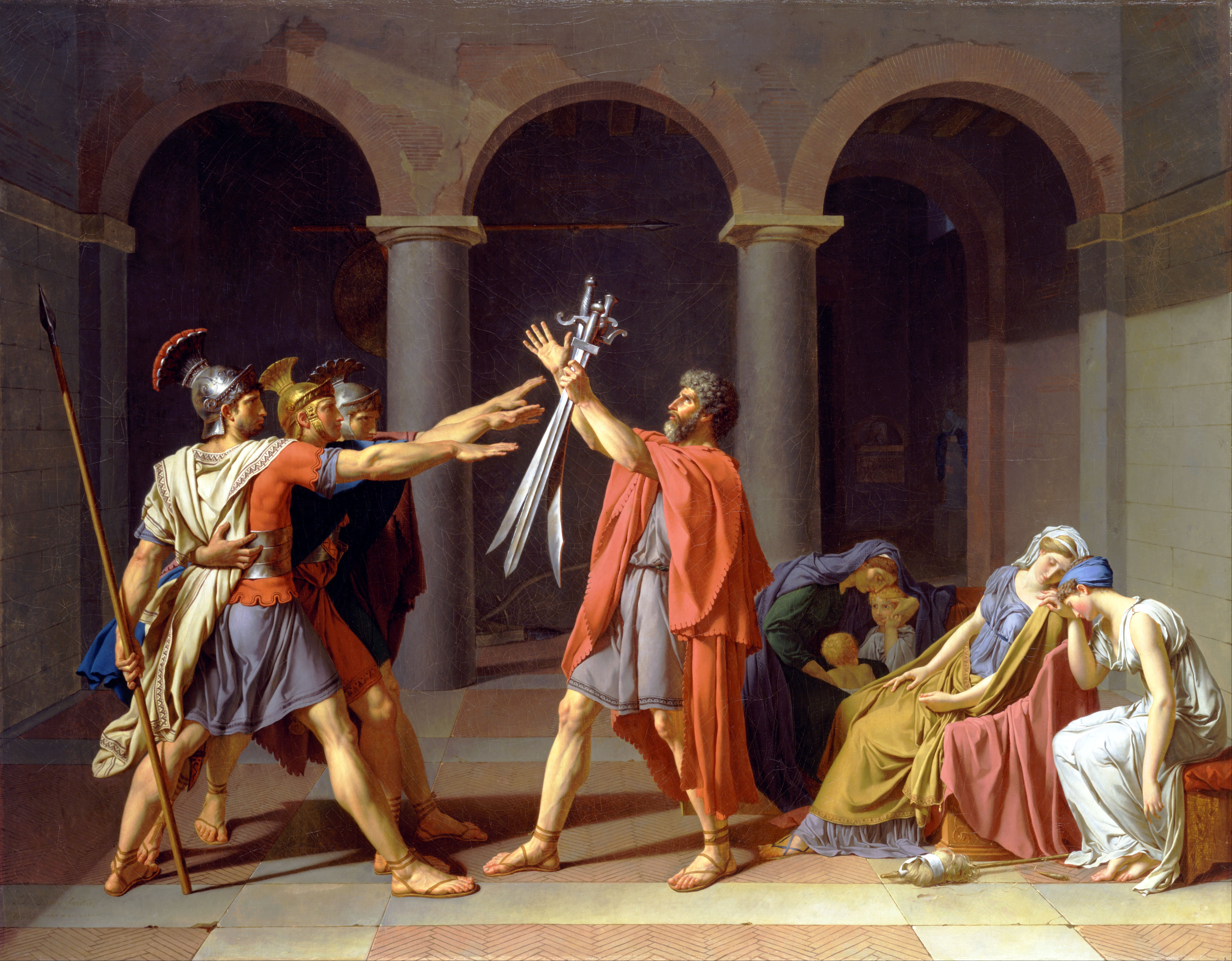
Oath of the Horatii by Jacques-Louis David (1781)

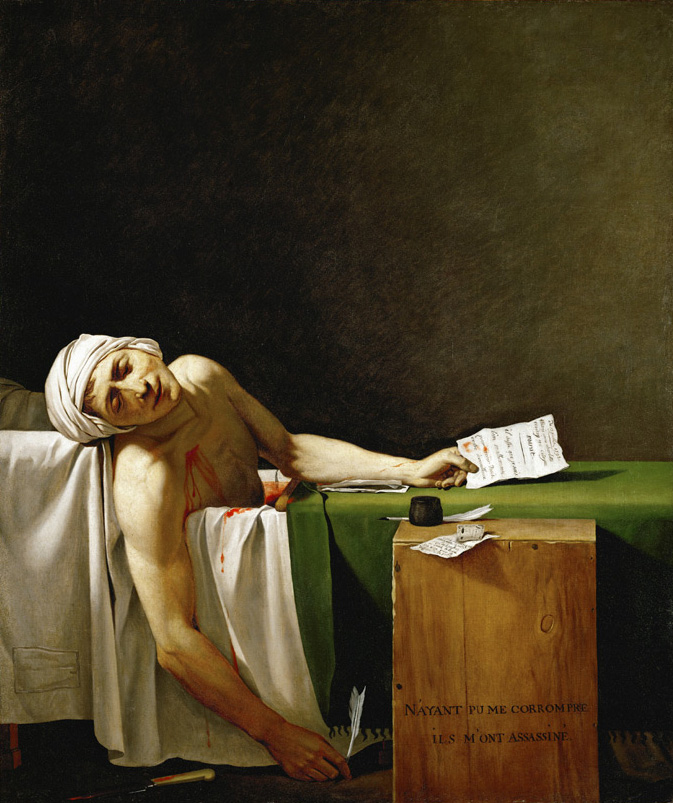
The Death of Marat by Jacques-Louis David (1793)

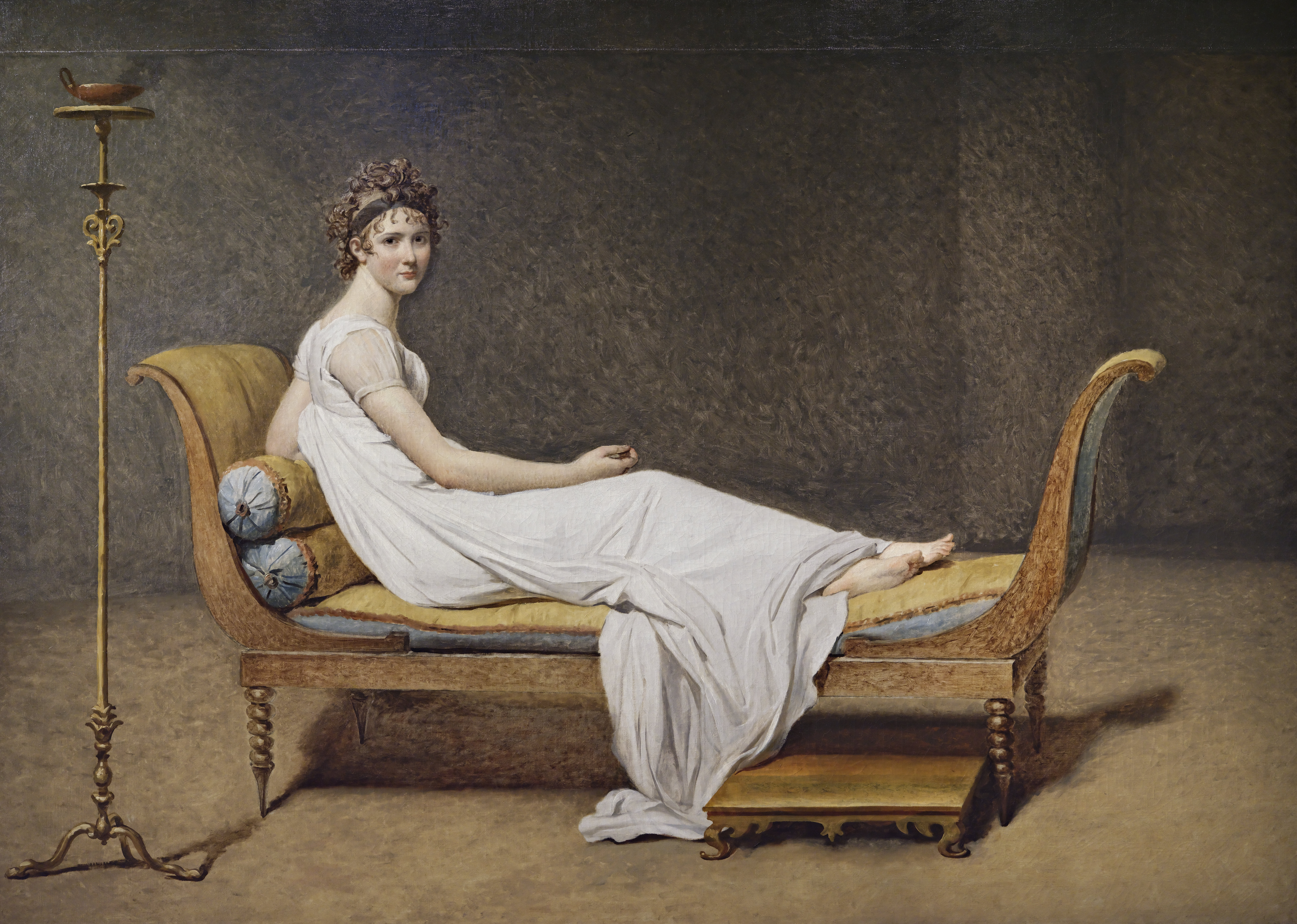
Portrait of Madame Récamier by Jacques-Louis David (1800)

French painting was dominated for years by David and his pupils, including Antoine-Jean Gros (1771–1835), and later Jean-Auguste Dominique Ingres (1780–1867). The later neoclassical painters put aside the political messages and concentrated on idealized figures and ideas of beauty; they included François Gérard, who like David, made a famous Portrait of Juliette Récamier, much to the annoyance of David; Jean-Baptiste Regnault (1754–1829); Pierre-Paul Prud'hon (1758–1823); Élisabeth Vigée Le Brun (1755–1842) and Anne Louis Girodet-Trioson (1767–1824).

Lady Hamilton as a Bacchante'' by Élisabeth Vigée Le Brun (1790)

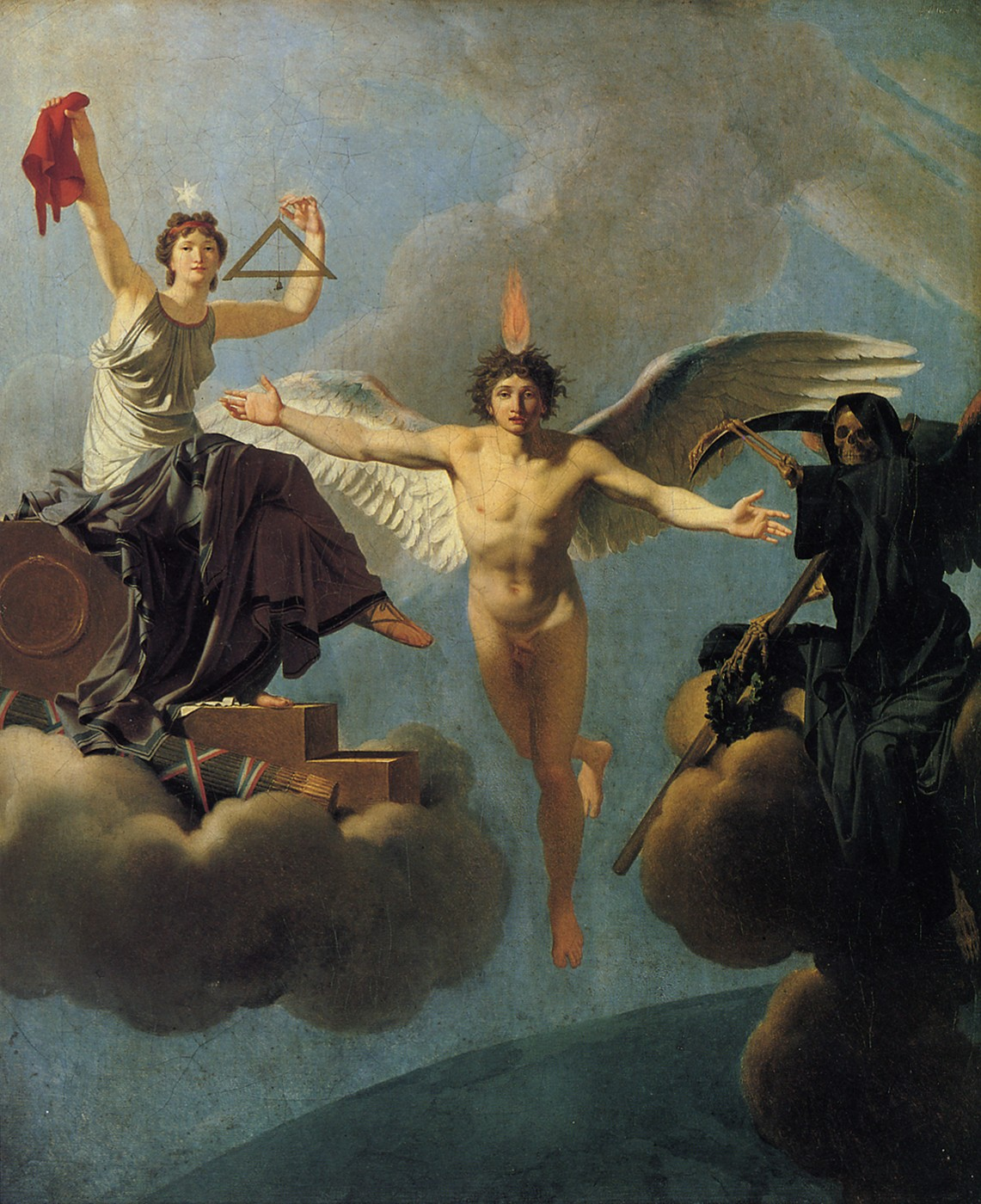
Liberty or Death by Jean-Baptiste Regnault (1795)

Mademoiselle Lange as Danae by Anne Louis Girodet-Trioson (1799)

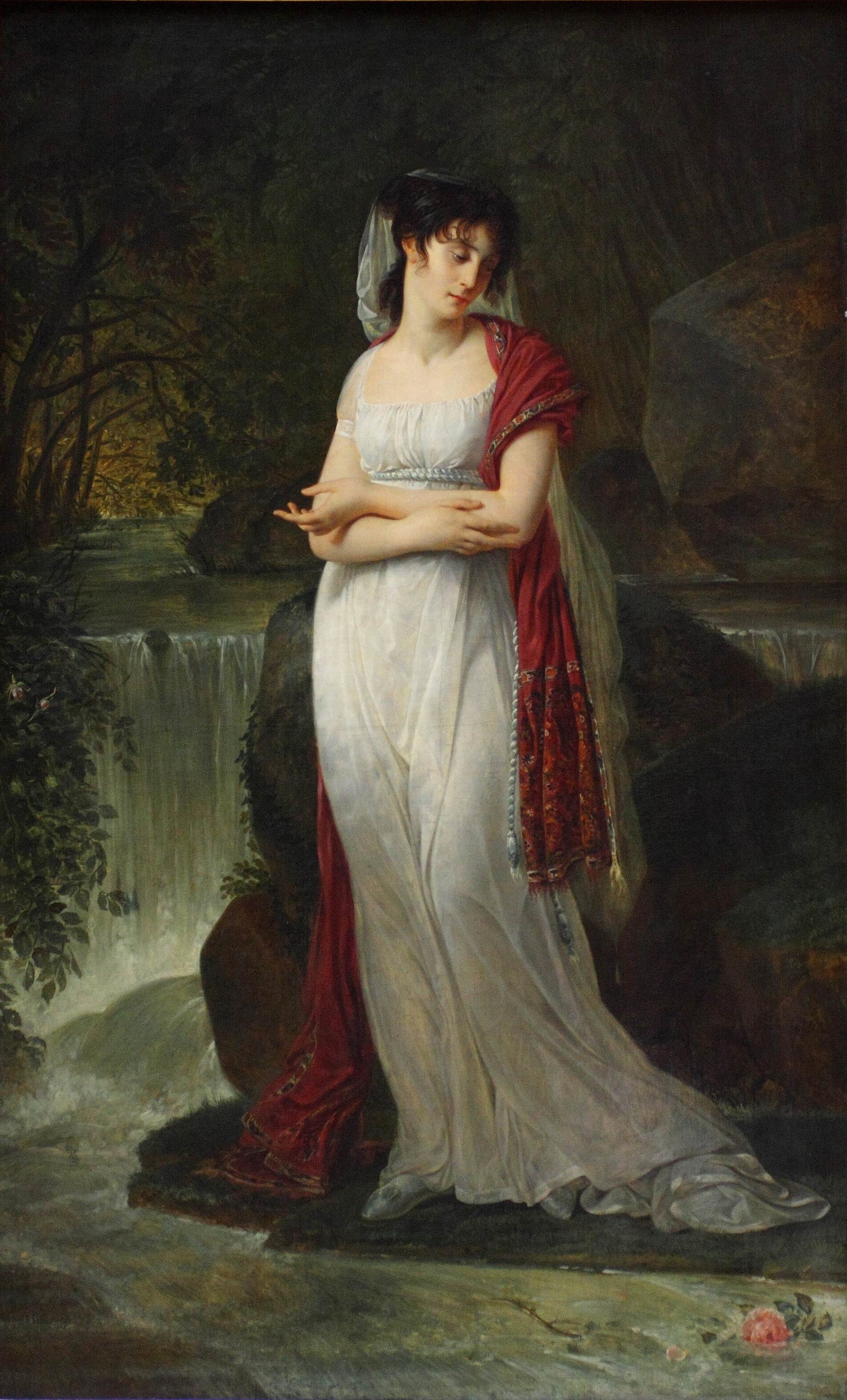
Portrait of Christine Boyer by Antoine-Jean Gros (1800)

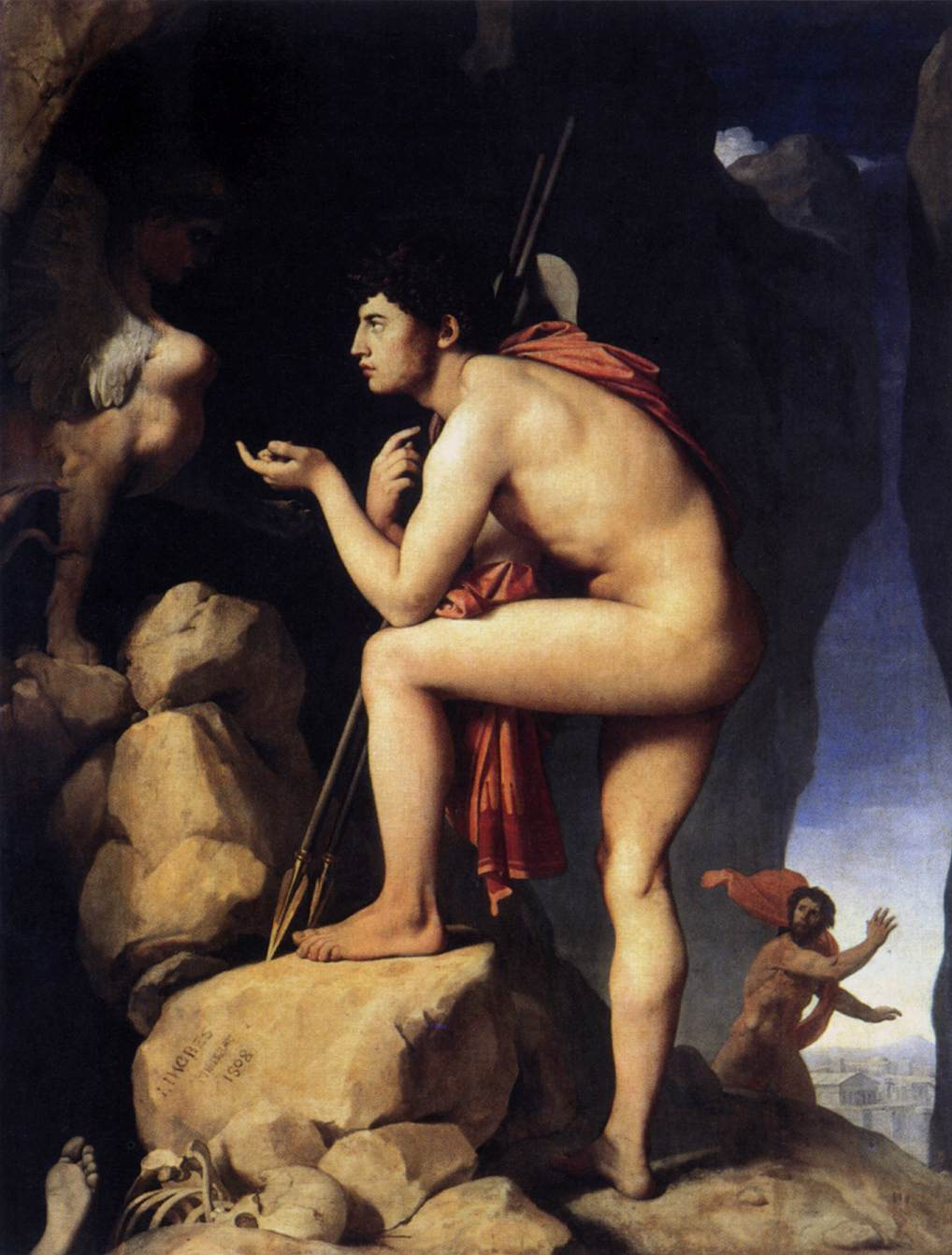
Oedipus and the Sphinx by Jean-Auguste-Dominique Ingres (1800)

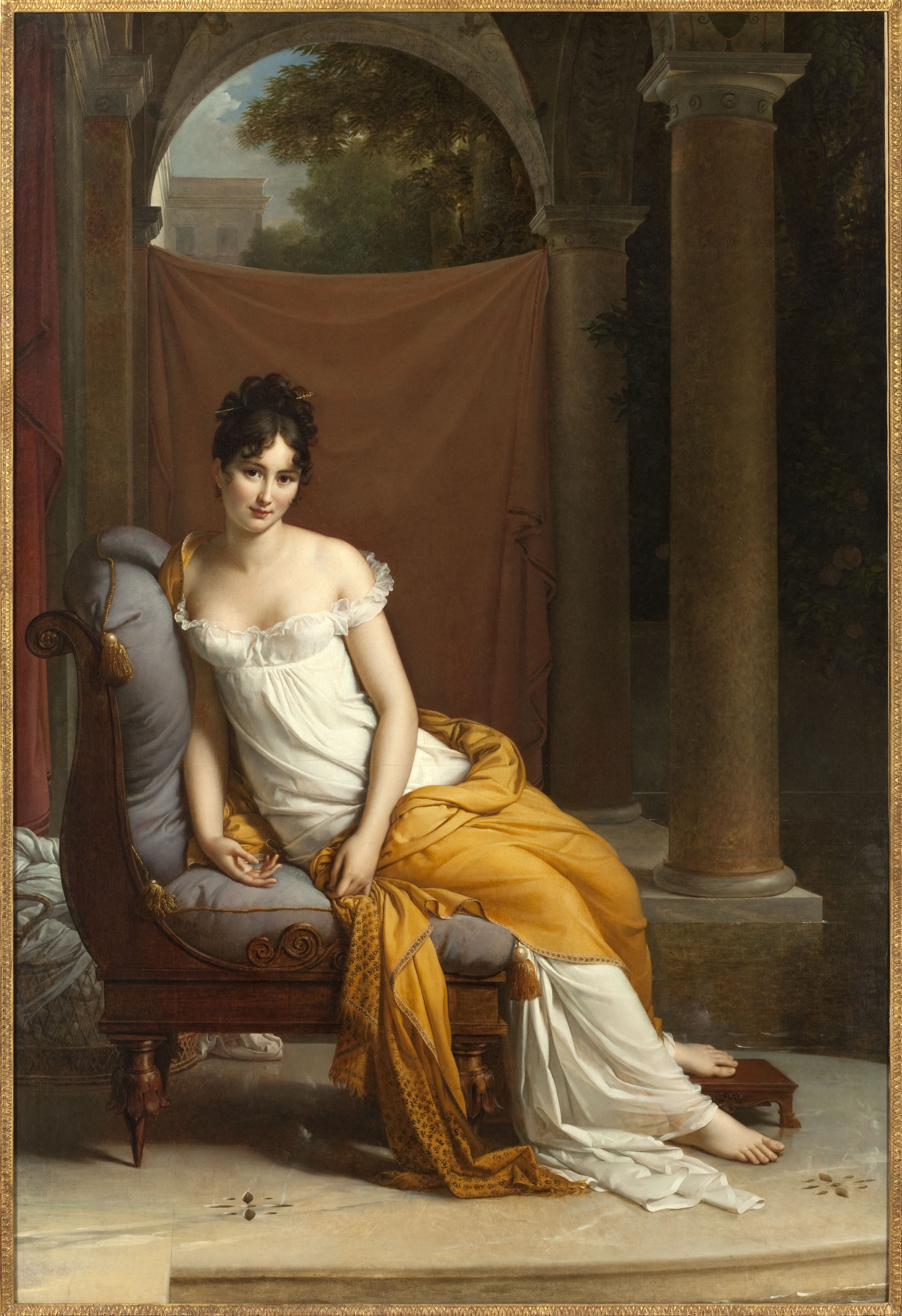
Portrait of Juliette Récamier by François Gérard (1805)

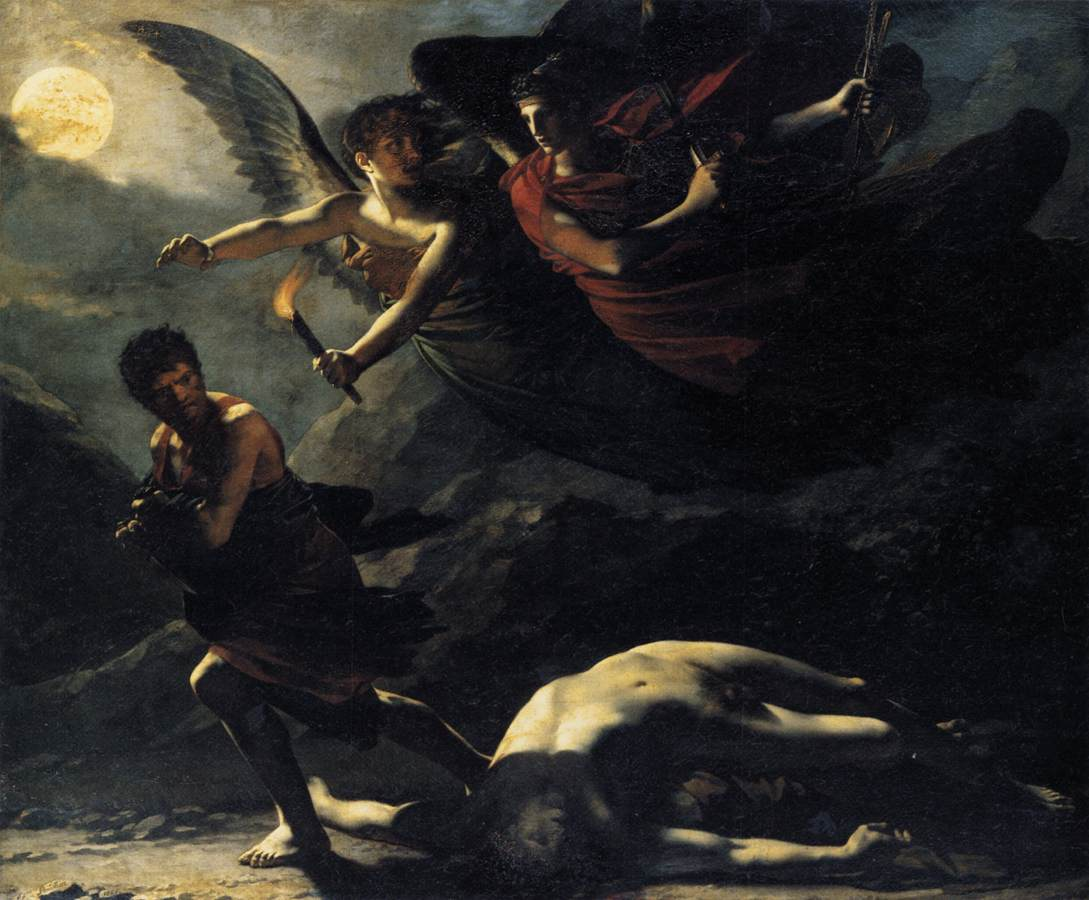
Justice and Divine Vengeance Pursuing Crime by Pierre-Paul Prud'hon (1808)

== Sculpture ==
The most prominent French sculptor in the early neoclassical period was Étienne Maurice Falconet (1716–1791). whose work included the Bronze Horseman of Peter the Great in Saint Petersburg, Russia (model made in 1770, but not cast until 1782). He was named professor at the Académie royale de peinture et de sculpture in Paris in 1766, and from 1757 onward he directed the modeling of small sculptures in porcelain at the Sèvres Porcelain manufactory. His work remained closer to the statues in full movement of the French baroque than the new, more serene style. In his later years he designed small ornamental sculptures of cast bronze such as the Seated Girl (1788), now in the Metropolitan Museum of Art.

The first more clearly neoclassical major figure was Jean-Antoine Houdon (1741–1828). He studied at the French Academy in Rome, where he made detailed studies of the anatomy of the ancient Roman and Greek statues on display there. He became famous for his busts and portrait sculptures, most notably his seated statue of Voltaire (1779–81), now on display at the Comédie-Française, and his busts of Benjamin Franklin and other political figures of the day. He also created several allegorical works illustrating winter and summer in a style entirely more expressive than traditional classicism, such as his La Frileuse (woman in winter), in the Musée Fabre in Montpellier.

The sculptor Claude Michel (1738–1814), also known as Clodion, also studied at the Academy in Rome between 1762 and 1771. His works varied widely from neoclassical to rococo; he conceived a terra-cotta model for an extraordinary monumental sculpture, covered with statuary of angels and cupids, to celebrate the first balloon flight in Paris by the Montgolfier brothers (1784).

Augustin Pajou (1730–1809) also studied at the French Academy in Rome from 1752 and 1756. He returned to Paris to teach at the Académie royale de peinture et de sculpture, and became rector in 1792. He made a series of highly expressive statues on mythological subjects, including Psyche and Amour.

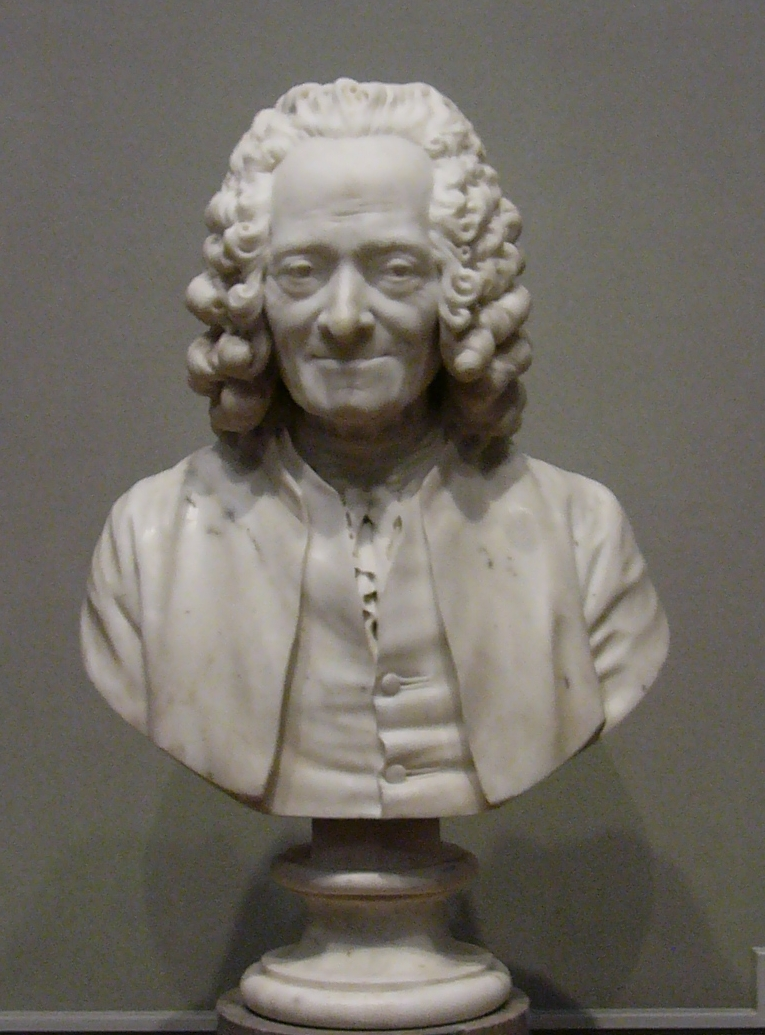
Bust of Voltaire by Jean-Antoine Houdon (1778), National Gallery

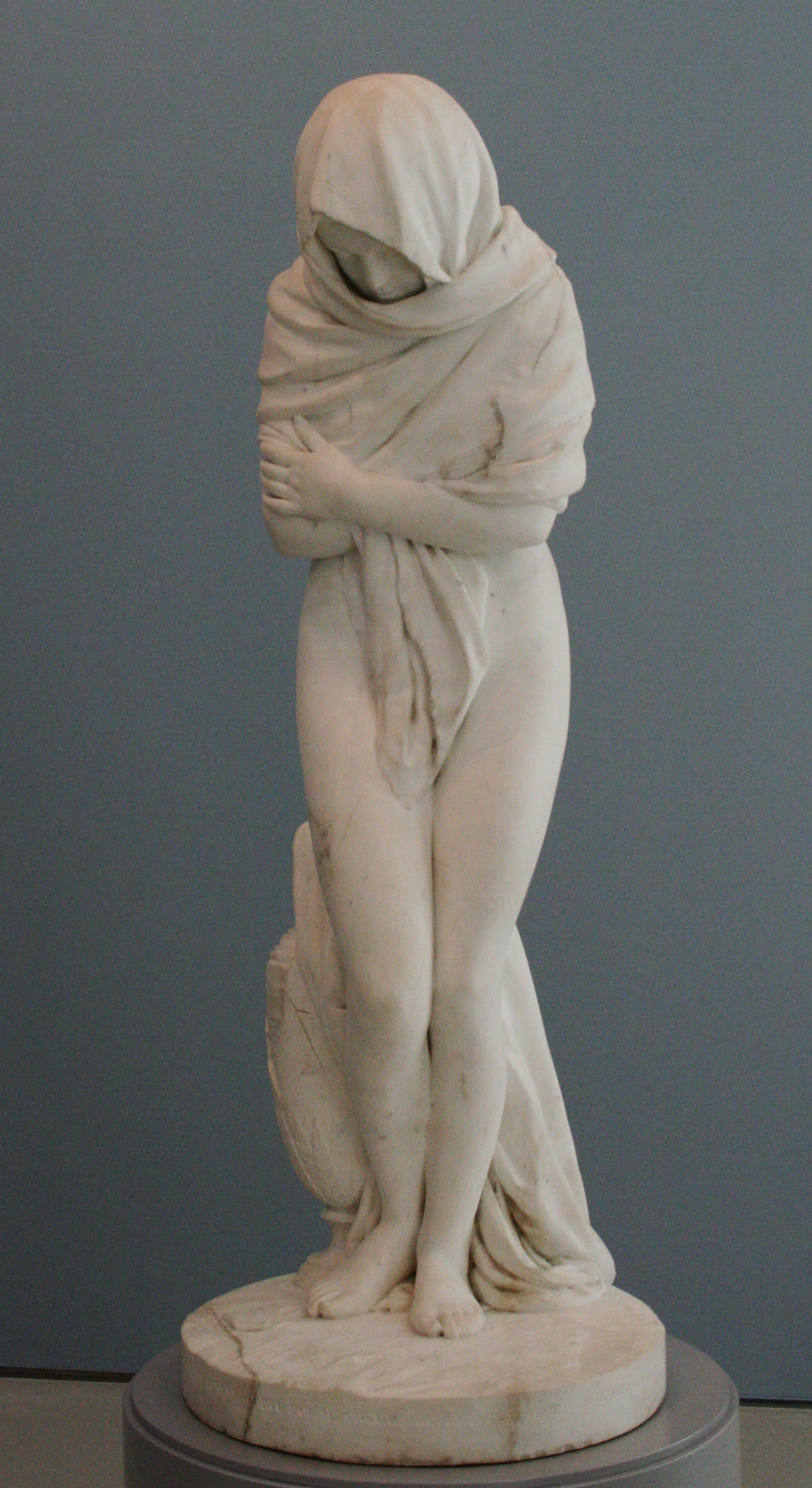
La frileuse (woman in winter), Jean-Antoine Houdon (1783)

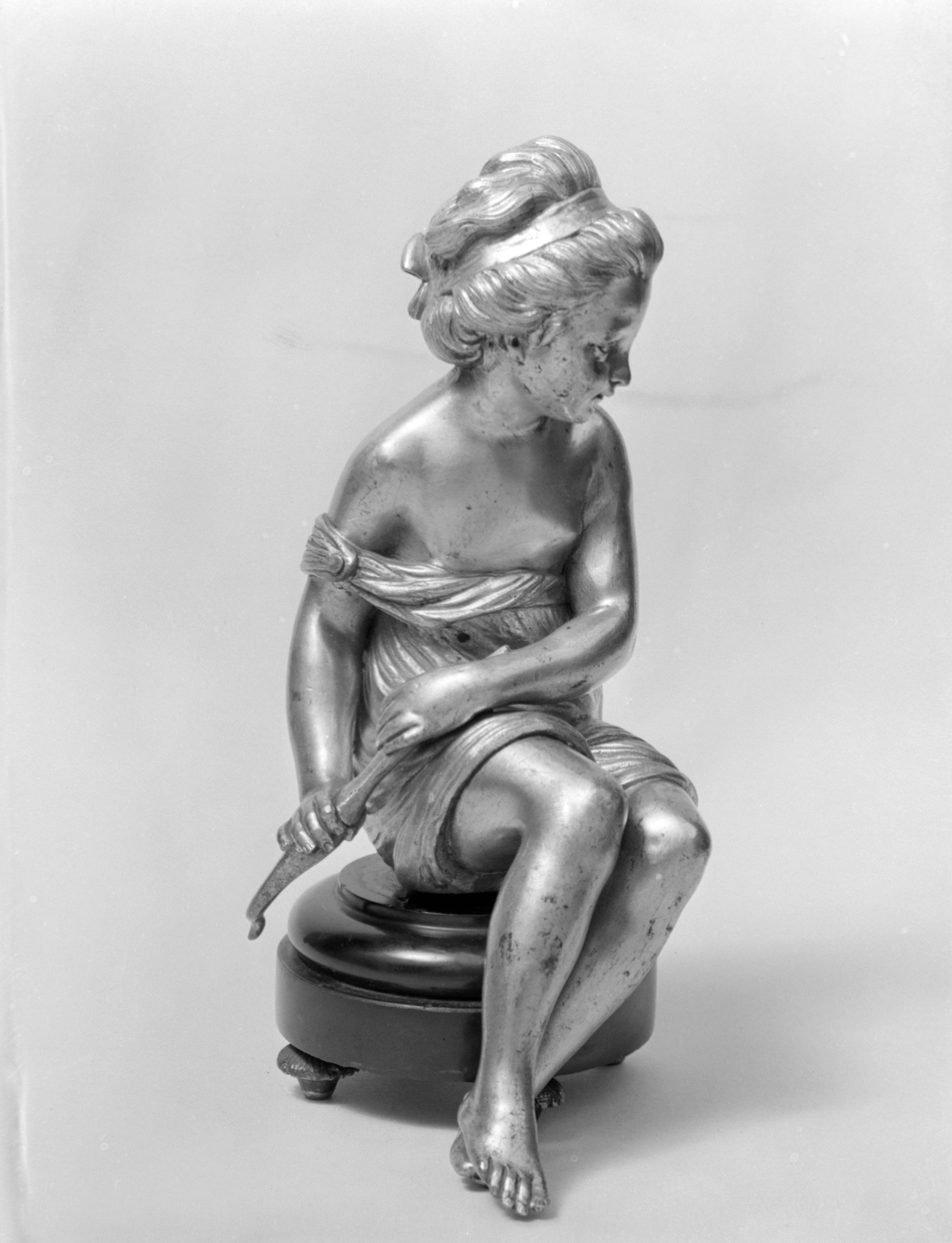
Seated Girl by Étienne Maurice Falconet, in bronze (1788), Metropolitan Museum of Art

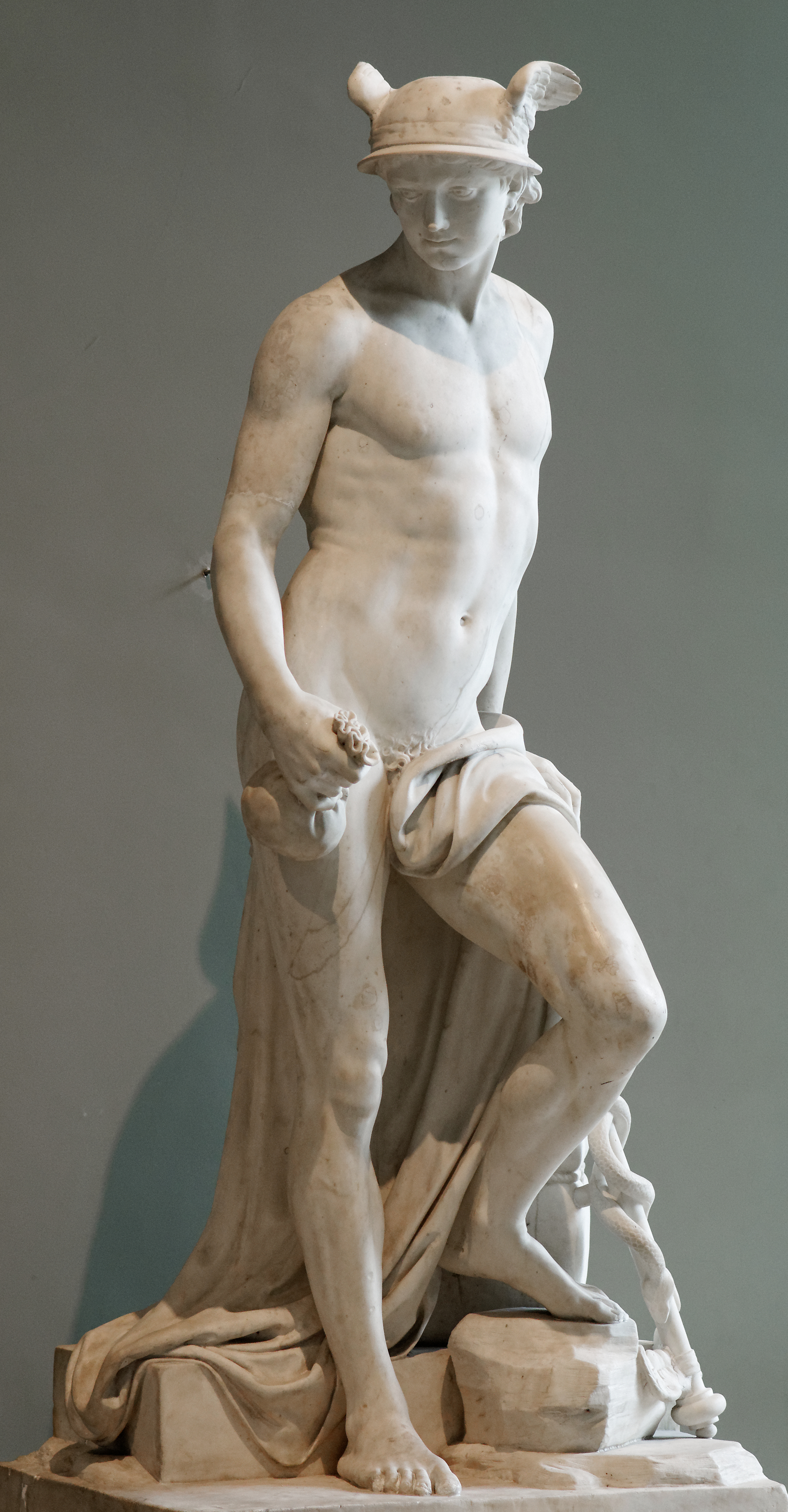
Mercury by Augustin Pajou (1780), Louvre

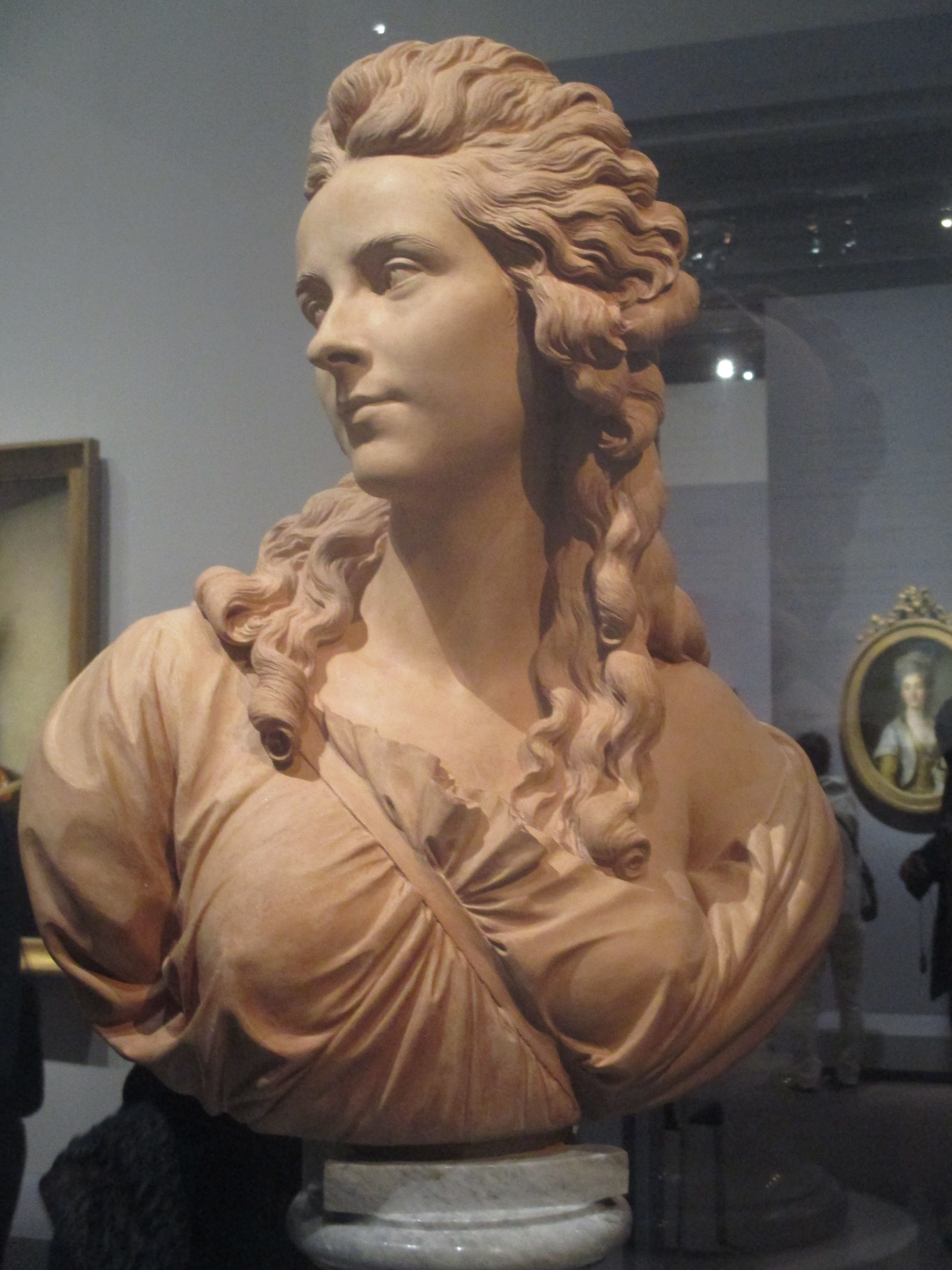
Bust of Madame Vigée Le Brun by Augustin Pajou (1785), Louvre

== Music ==
The effects on Neoclassicism in art are very spotted through artworks and sculptures, but when it comes to music, it is at times overlooked. With the emergence of new ideals, and the shift towards independence from the crown, French society began to see a change in architecture and design, as well as in the arts. Their shift in music commenced the beginning of the romantic era in musical history. The revolts in France at the time, created an environment of hostility and uneasiness, forcing many opera writers to look to France's past in order to portray a sense of unification for the French commoners. In many senses, these operas, and musical settings played political roles in being able to pass on political beliefs on topics, in order to evoke a greater sense of unity in the viewers, believing that many others saw the causes as they personally did.

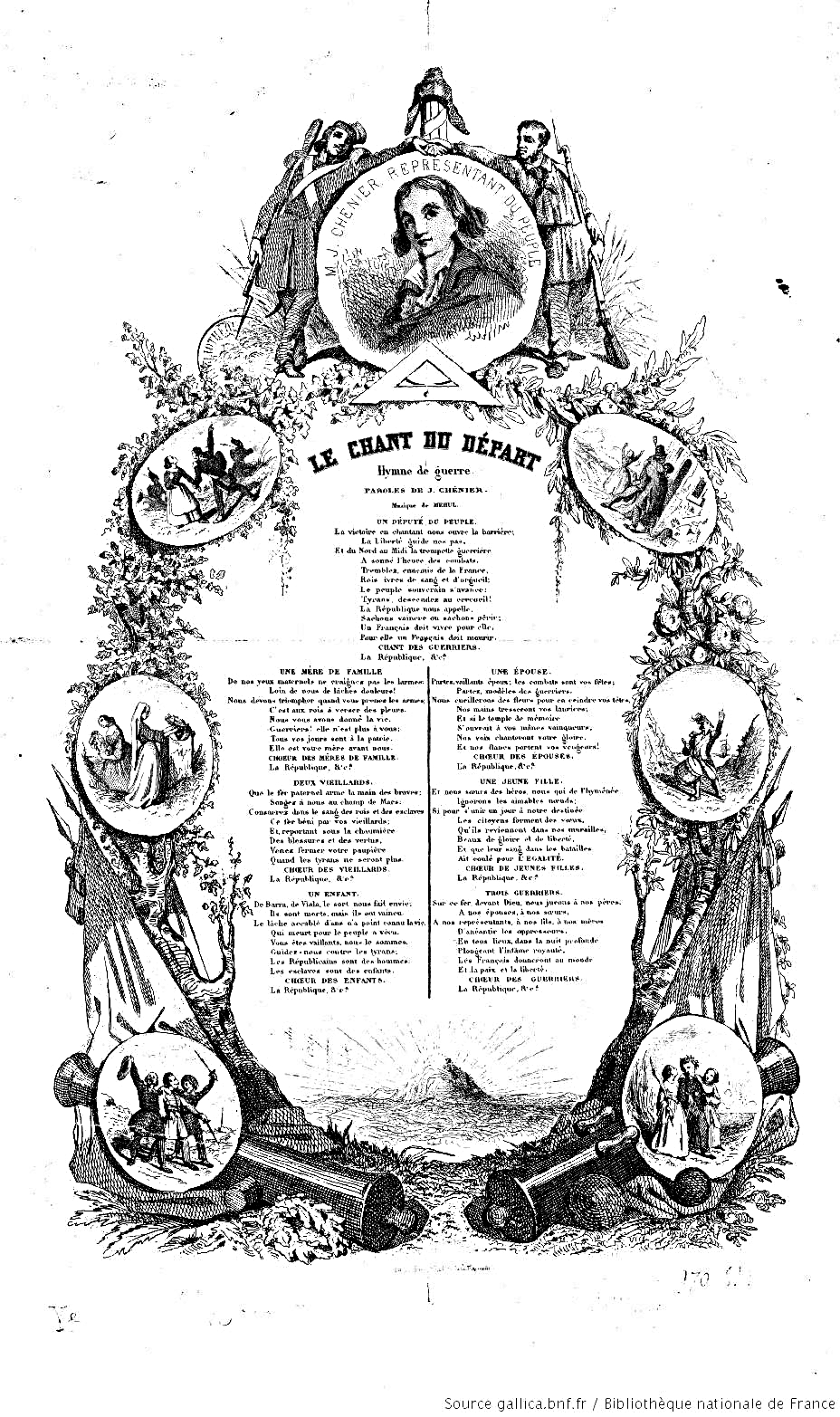
Printed copy of Le Chant du départ

In the era of the French Revolution, particularly under the rule of Napoleon, the famous composer Étienne Méhul was known for composing many patriotic pieces for the people and nation of France. Most famous of which is Le Chant du départ, later becoming the official anthem of the French Empire in 1794. Often compared to the current national anthem of France, La Marseillaise, Le Chant du depart holds ties to the unity of the French people, as well as the diversity of French society. The points of view of those who sing range from a deputy to their soldiers, mother, wives, husbands, and fathers, depicting the roles they must take and live through during this era of revolution. The grammatical composition itself from the piece generalizes the characters, for them to see each other as equals under the premise of victory and success. Banned by both Napoleon and Louis XVIII for its revolutionary ties, La Marseillaise, achieves the similar goal of uniting the people of France by evoking from them a sense of patriotism, as it was nicknamed “Chant de guerre pour l'Armée du Rhin” (War song for the Army of the Rhine). Written by Claude Joseph Rouget de Lisle, it displayed the primary aspects of neoclassical music of this era, La Marseillaise tells the story of the strength of the people and army, in this scenario of their strength against the Austrian and Prussian troops. Uniting them through a renewal of both baroque and classical music, it is not of the glorious history of France, but of the resilience of its people who fought, and still fight to create the nation in which they dreamed to build. Eventually being brought back as the song of the people, it was restored to its position as national anthem, as it remains to this day.

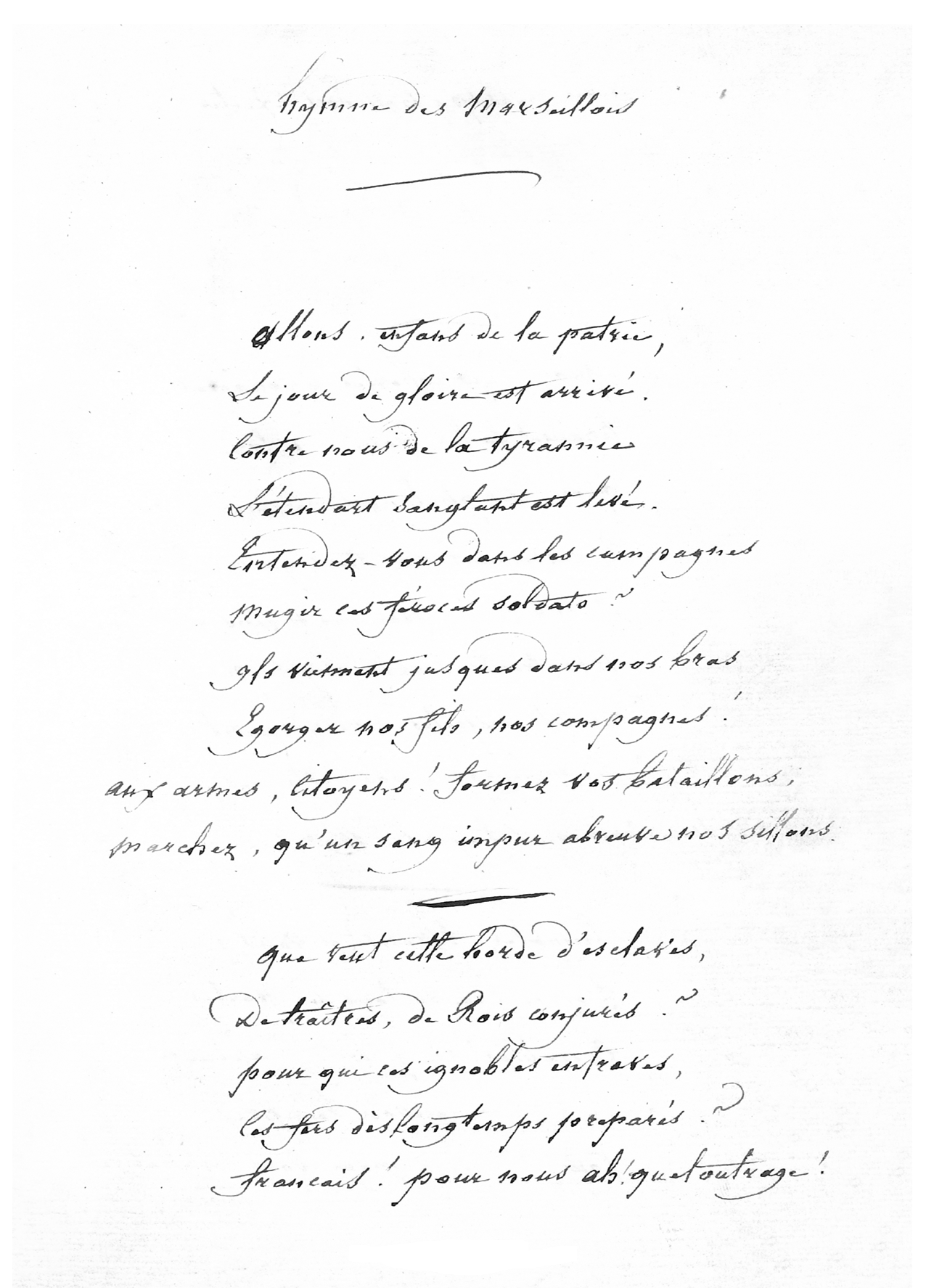
Manuscript of La Marseillaise

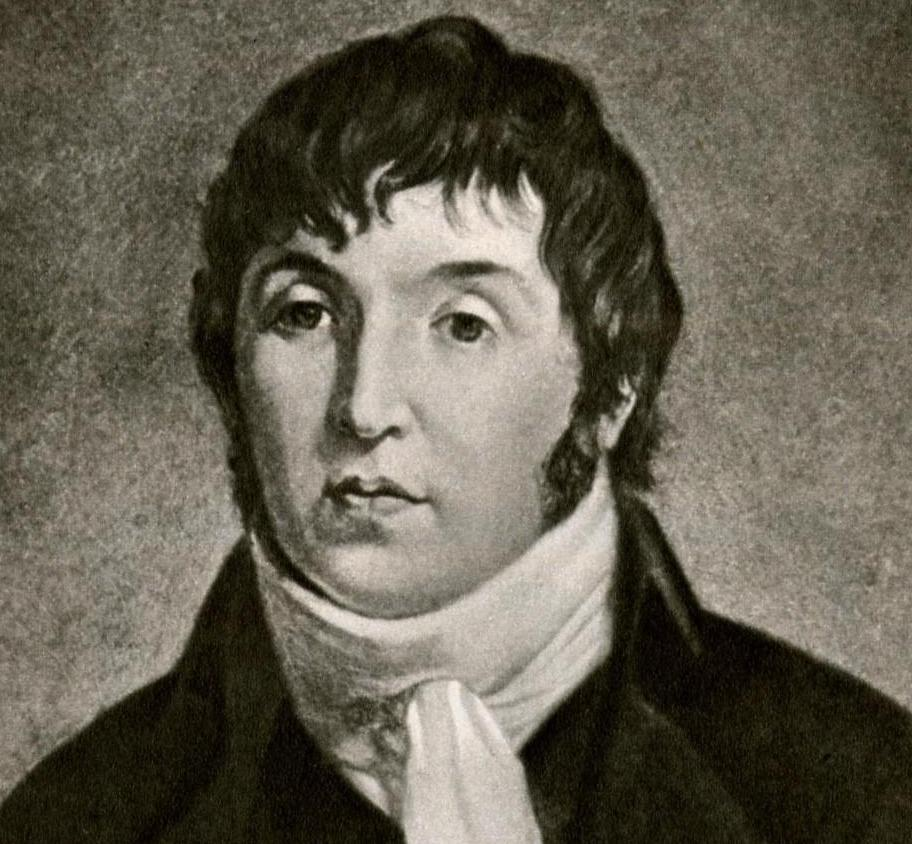
Portrait of Claude Joseph Rouget de Lisle

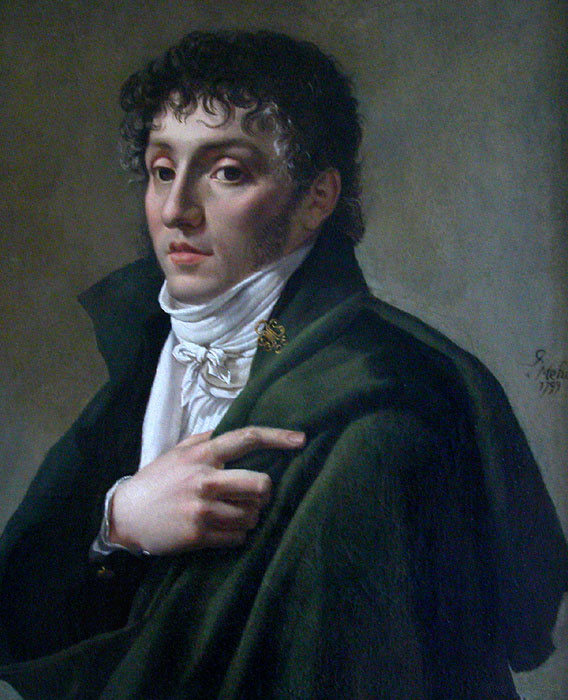
Étienne Méhul (1763-1817) composed Le Chant du depart

== Interior decoration ==
The goût Grec or "Greek taste" in design was introduced in France in 1757 by Jean-François de Neufforge in his book Recueil élémentaire d'architecture, which praised "the majestic and sober style of the architects of ancient Greece." He offered engravings of classical vaults, garlands of laurel leaves, palmettos and guilloches (braided interlaced ribbons) and other motifs which soon appeared in Paris salons.

Beginning in the 1770s, the style pompéien or Pompeii style came into fashion in Paris, based on reproductions of designs found in Pompeii, augmented with arabesques, griffons, sphinxes, horns-of-plenty and vases on tripods, interlaced with vines and medallions and painted on tall rectangular panels on the walls painted white and bordered with gilded stucco. The new style also took inspiration from the decorative grotesques of Raphael painted at the Vatican's Apostolic Palace in 1510. The boudoir of Marie Antoinette at the Palace of Fontainebleau, designed by Rousseau de la Routière in 1790, just after the Revolution began, is a notable example.

During the French Revolution, the aristocracy fled Paris, and most of the palaces and town houses were stripped of furnishings and decoration. A new version of neoclassicism appeared briefly during the French Directory (1795–99), which mingled elements the Pompeiian style with the Adam style from England. When Napoleon Bonaparte seized power from the Directory, the neoclassical style began to take on a new form, called Empire style (1799–1815).

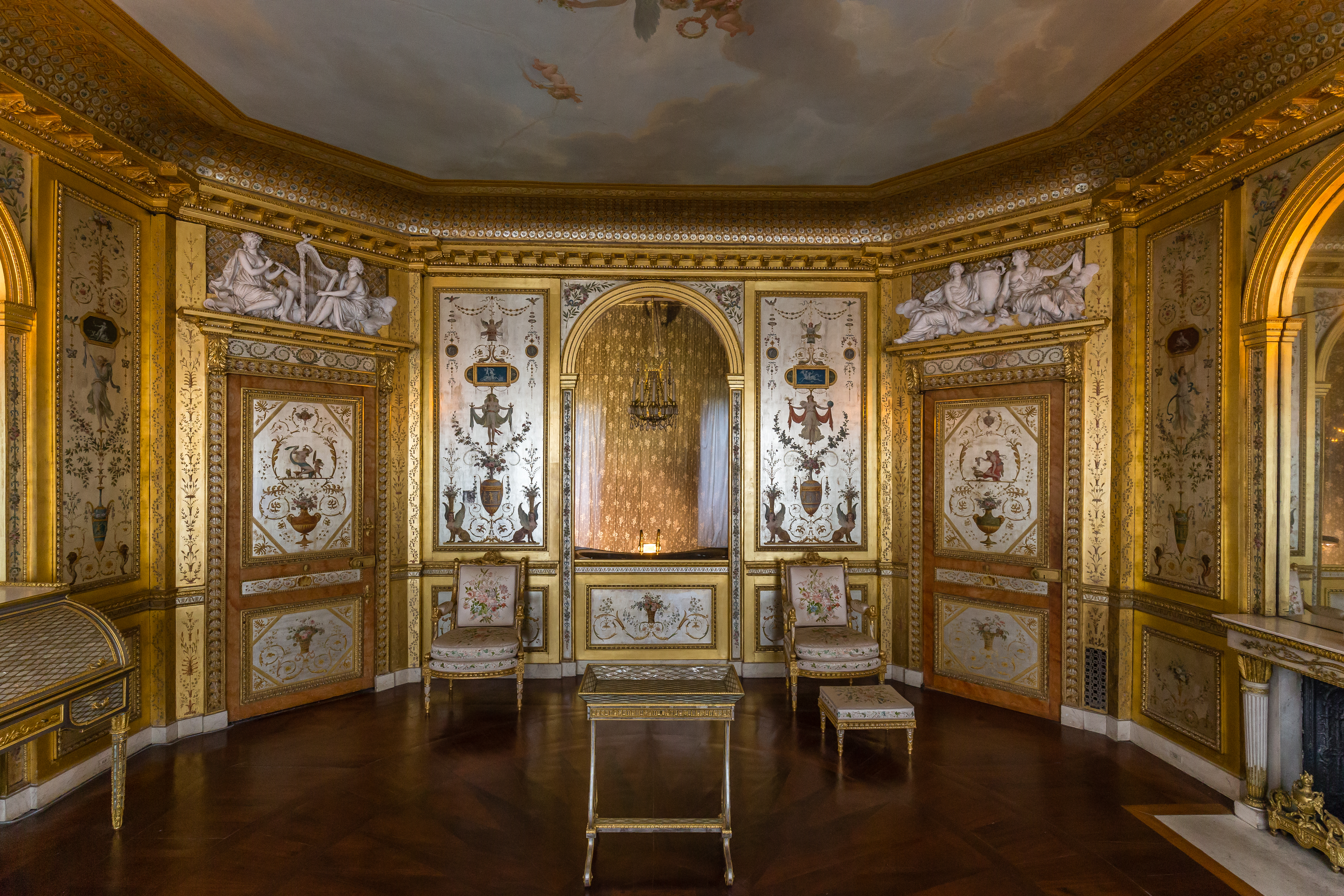
Boudoir of Marie Antoinette, Palace of Fontainebleau (1790)

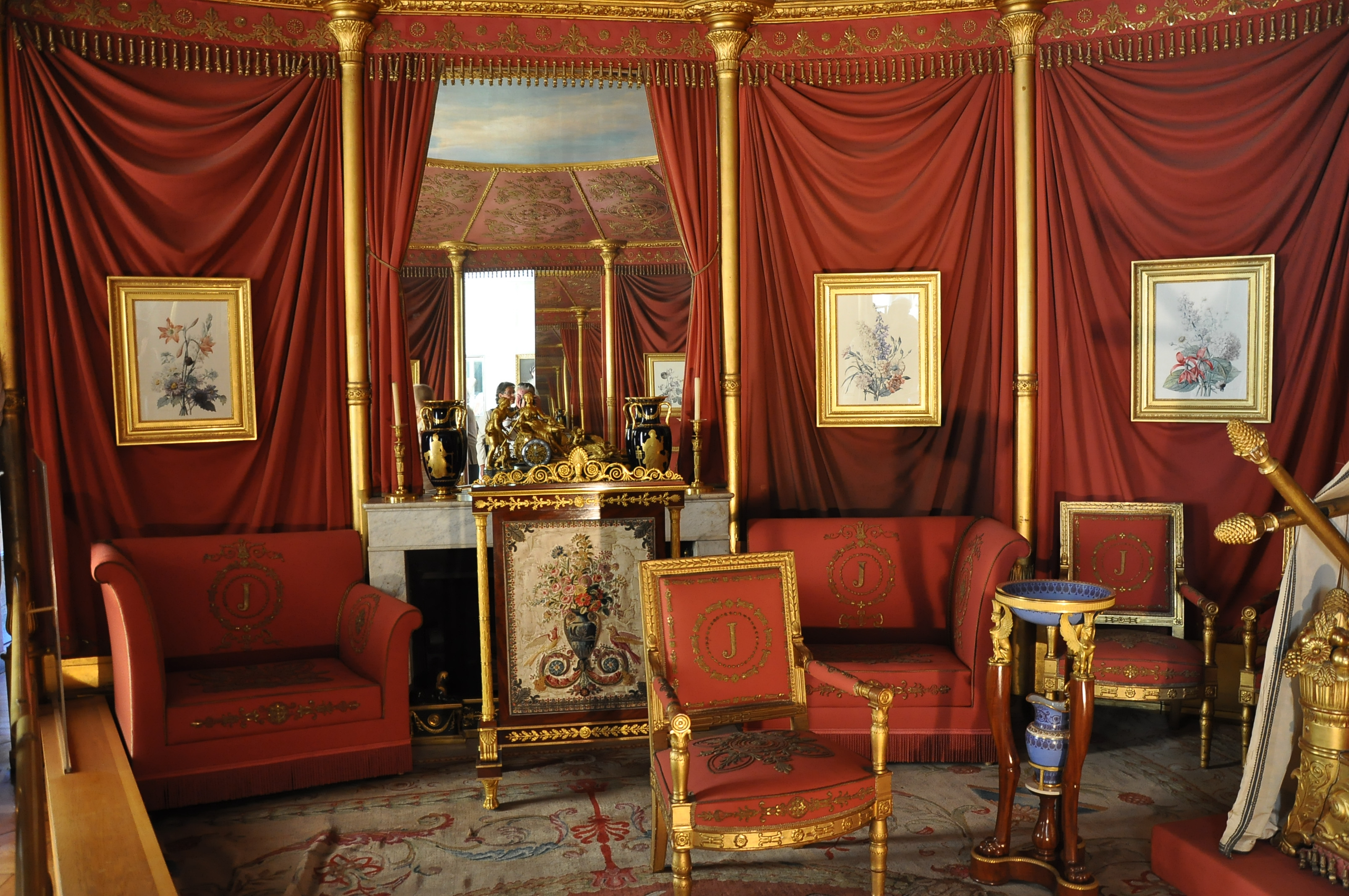
Apartment of the Empress Joséphine de Beauharnais at the Château de Malmaison (1800)

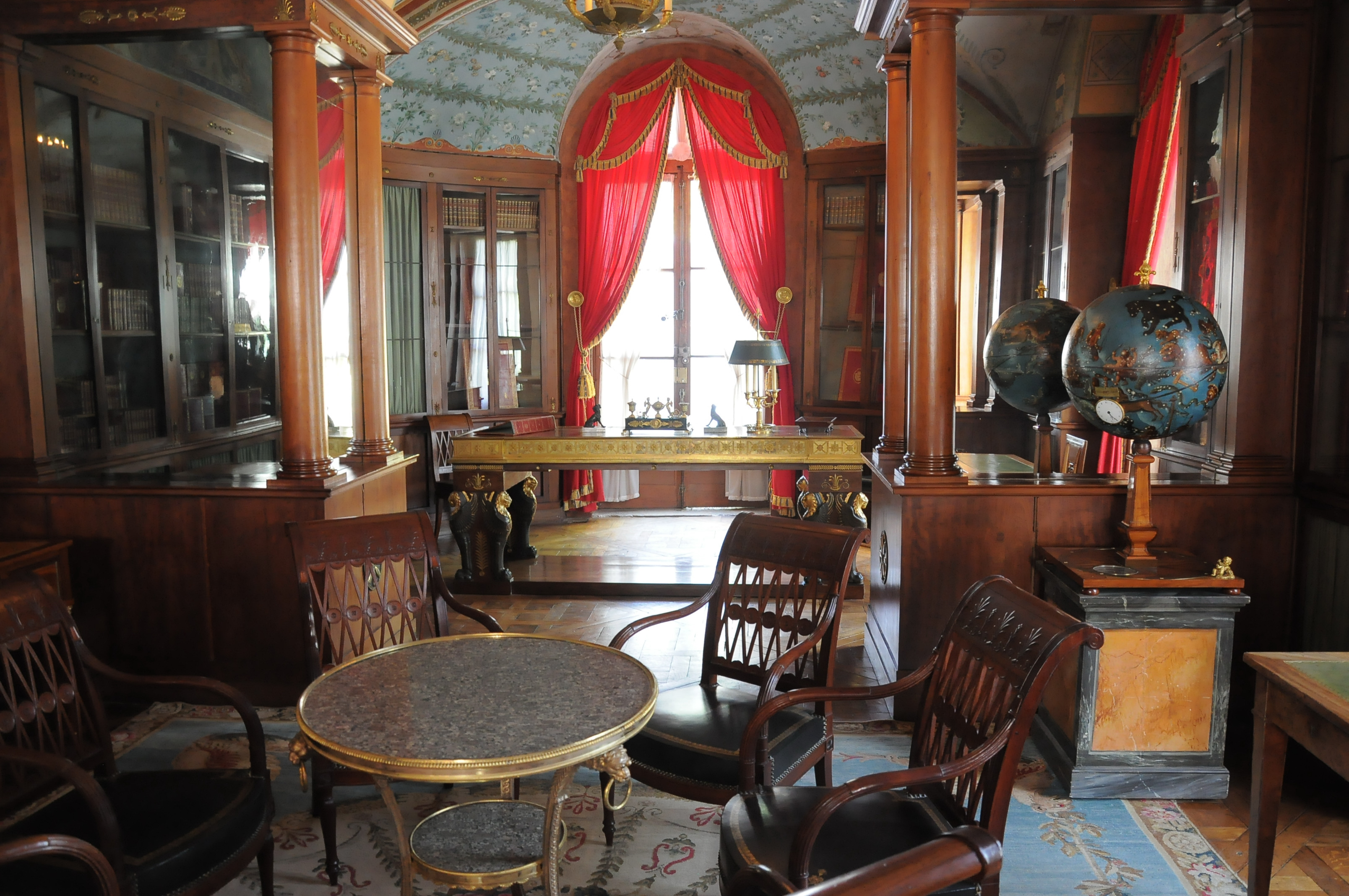
Library of the Château de Malmaison, made for Empress Joséphine by Percier and Fontaine (1800)

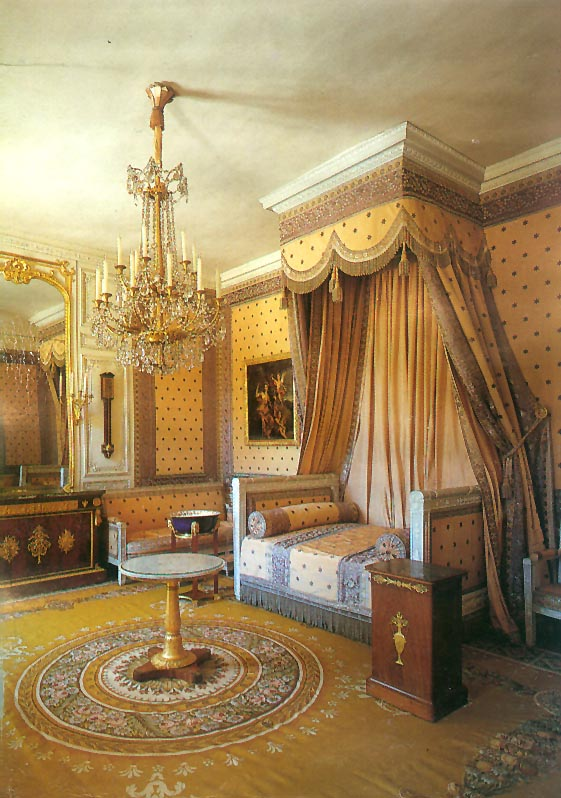
Napoleon's bedroom at the Grand Trianon, Palace of Versailles

The Empire style had extraordinary coherence and audacious simplicity, thanks to Napoleon's two energetic chief designers, Charles Percier (1764–1838) and Pierre-François-Léonard Fontaine (1762–1853). The motifs were usually symbols of empire, including crowns and laurel wreaths, medals, lyres, horns of plenty, and classical heads seen in profile. Rooms sometimes had the walls draped in fabric, representing the tents of an army on campaign. Interiors and furniture often featured classical columns carved of wood. Egyptian motifs and mythical beasts from antiquity, such as the sphinx, griffon and the chimera, were popular. Imperial emblems, including the eagle, the bee, and the letter N with a crown, were also common.

== Furniture ==
The first "Greek taste" furniture in France, made in 1756 and 1757 to designs by Jean-François de Neufforge (1714–1791) and Jean-Charles Delafosse (1734–1791), was massive, rectangular and heavily decorated, with gilded columns, friezes and hanging garlands. However, soon afterwards the royal cabinet maker Jean-Francois Oeben produced much lighter and more graceful works for Louis XV and Madame de Pompadour. These were a hybrid of the curves of rococo with the right angles of neoclassicism. The chairs had curving à cabriolet legs and cartouche-shaped backs, combined with neoclassic garlands and friezes. Oeben refurnished Versailles and other royal palaces with innovative new kinds of furniture; the cylinder, or roll-top desk; the table with a mechanical writing surface that could be raised; and the drop-front desk.

After the death of Oeben, his place was taken by two of his disciples, Jean-Henri Riesener (1734–1806) (who married Oeben's widow); and Jean-François Leleu. Riesener and Leleu produced furniture with superb wood-inlay, or marquetry, often in floral designs; and cabinets of mahogany decorated with glided bronze floral decor and column legs.

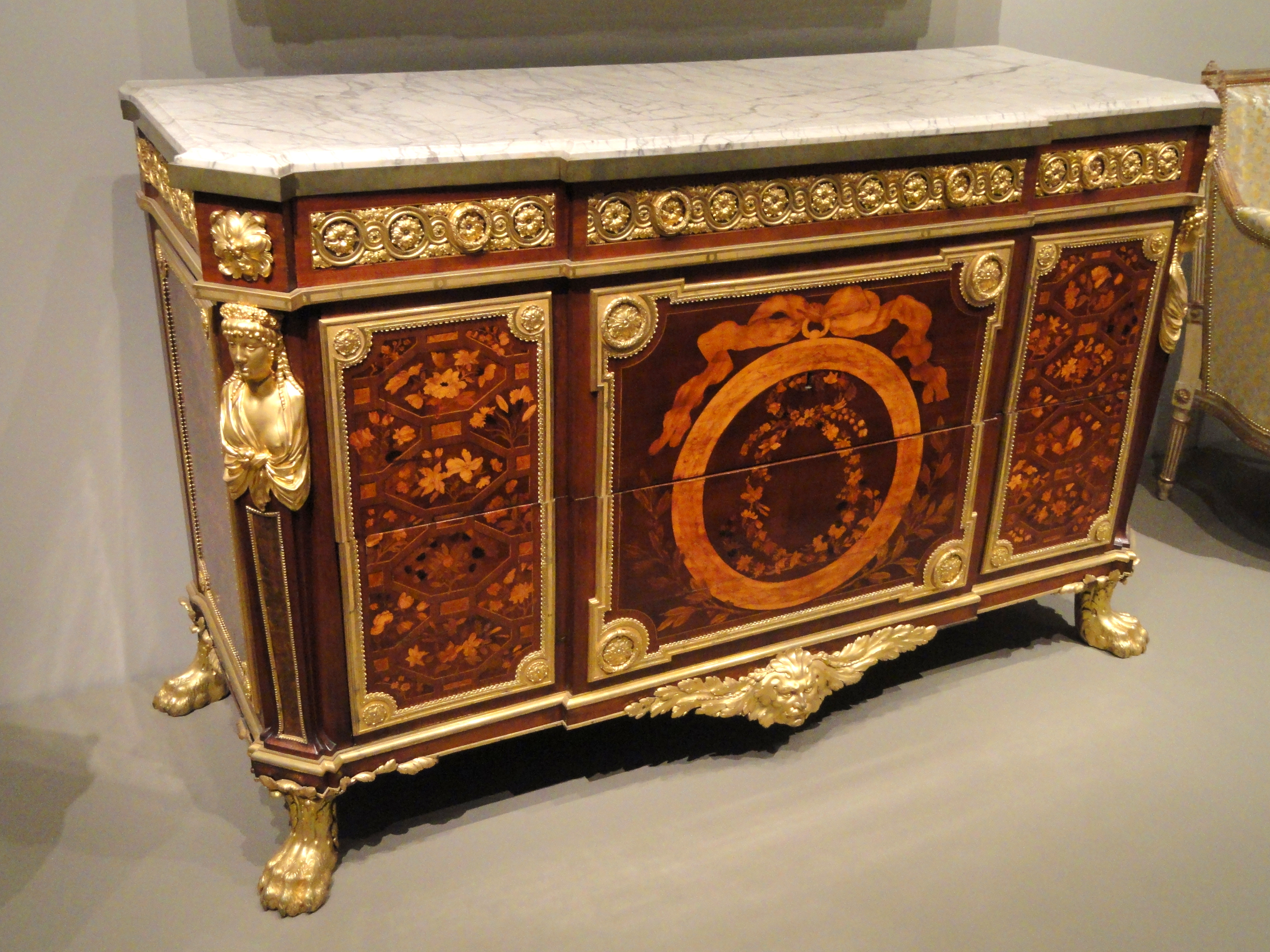
Commode by Jean-Henri Riesener (1770–80), Art Institute of Chicago

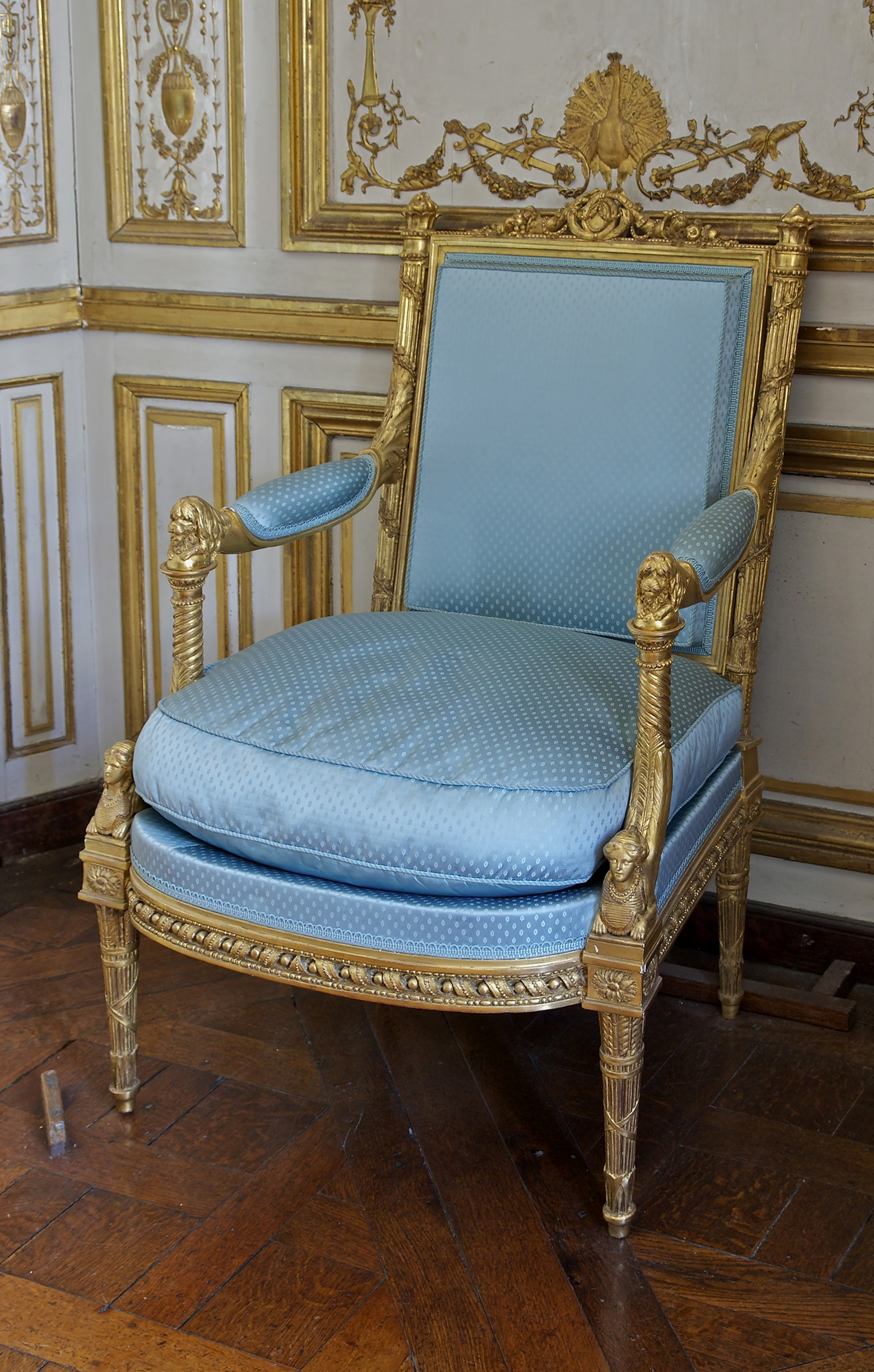
Armchair by Georges Jacob (1781), Palace of Versailles

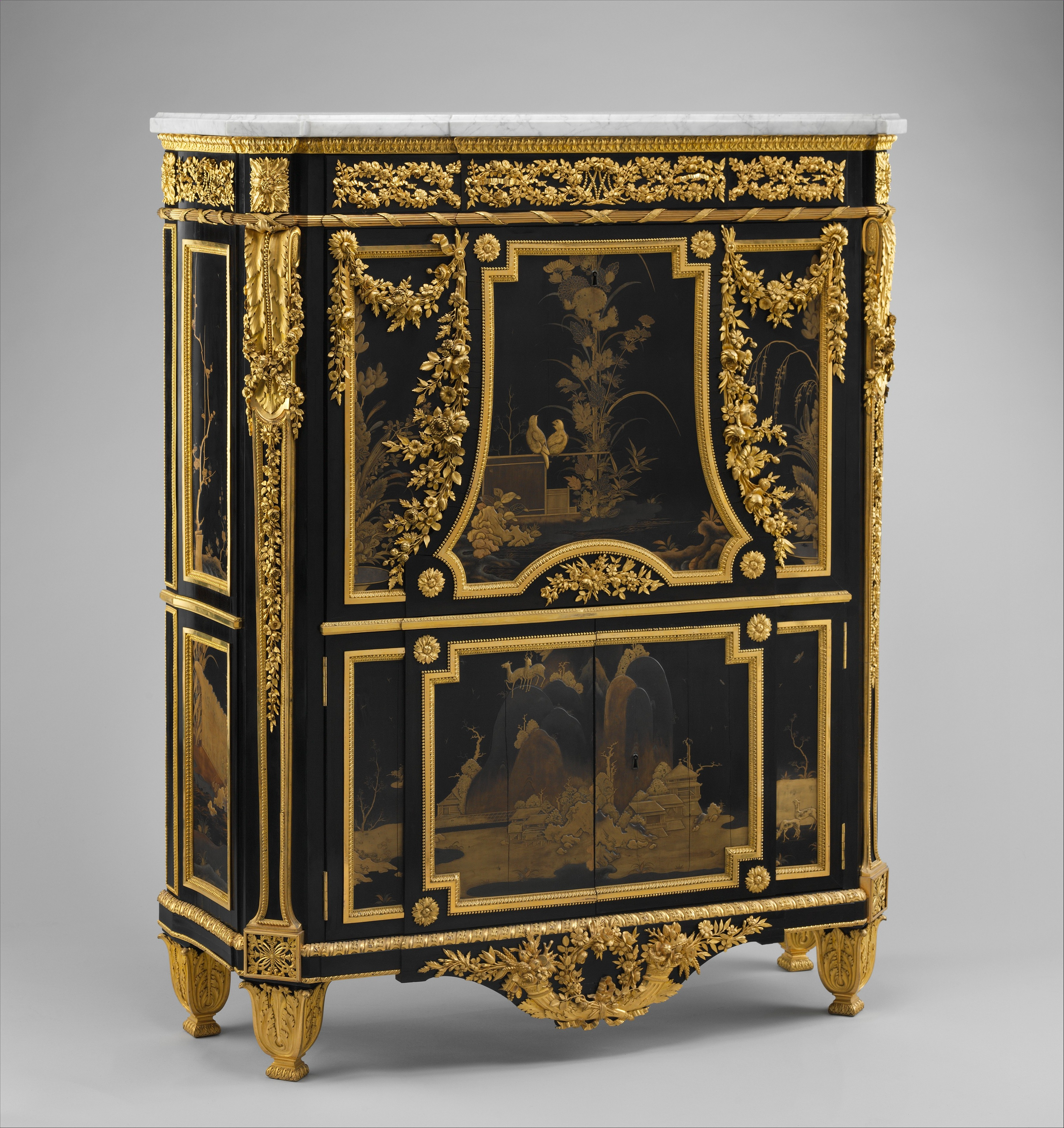
Drop-front desk by Jean-Henri Riesener (1783), Metropolitan Museum of Art

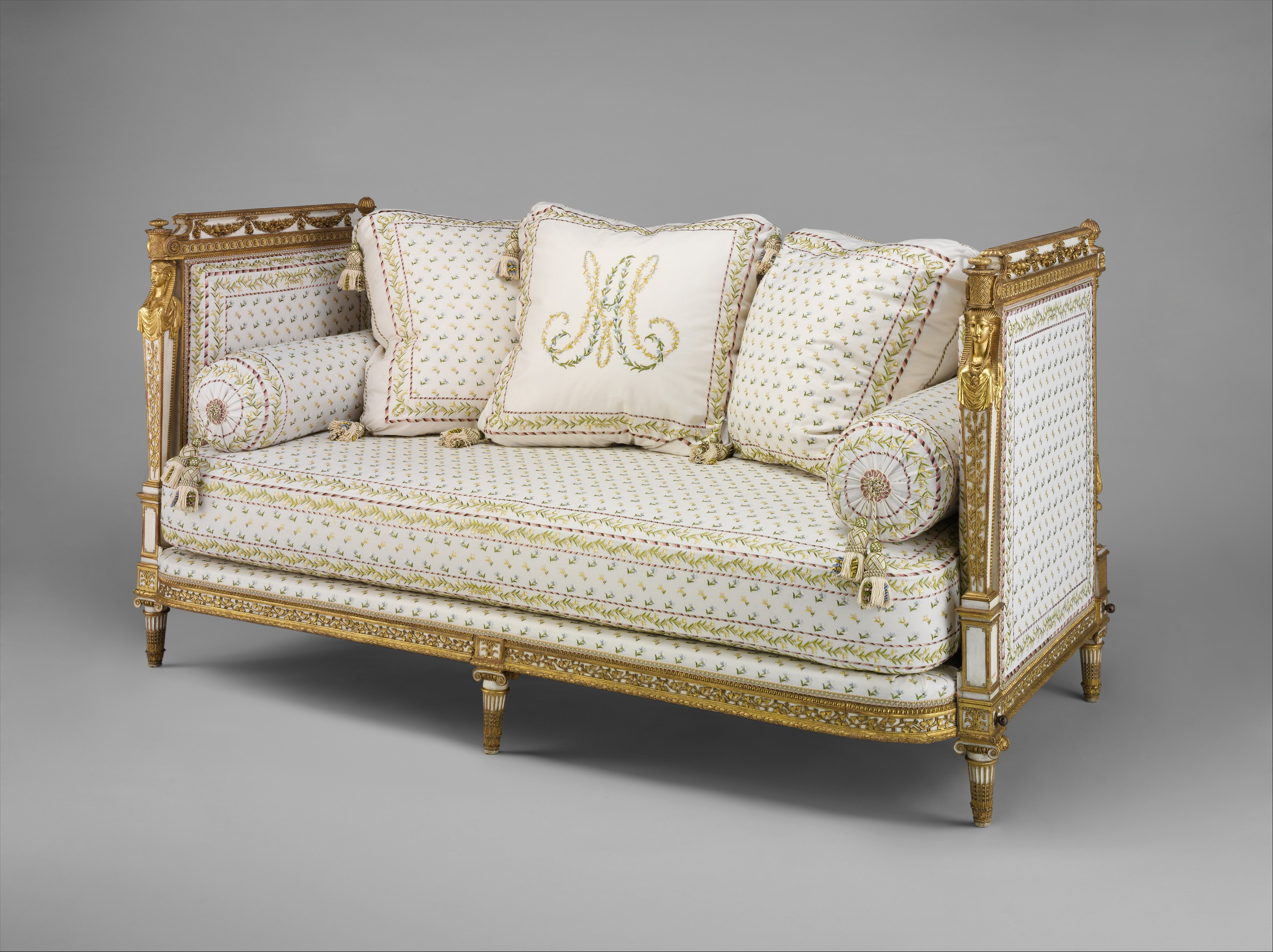
Day bed by Jean-Baptiste-Claude Sené (1788), Metropolitan Museum of Art

In Louis XVI furniture, particularly in the 1780s, the furniture styles became lighter, more geometric, and more simply ornamented, following the tastes of Marie Antoinette. The leading French designers during this period were Jean-Baptiste-Claude Sené (1748–1803) and Georges Jacob (1739–1814). At the very end of the reign of Louis XVI, Sené and Jacob were producing highly original and imaginative forms, including chairs with lyre-shaped carved wooden backs and the "Etruscan chair", a type conceived by the painter Hubert Robert for the fantasy "rural hamlet" of Marie-Antoinette at Versailles. The ornament on the chair, which remained popular long after the period ended, was borrowed from ancient Grecian vases.

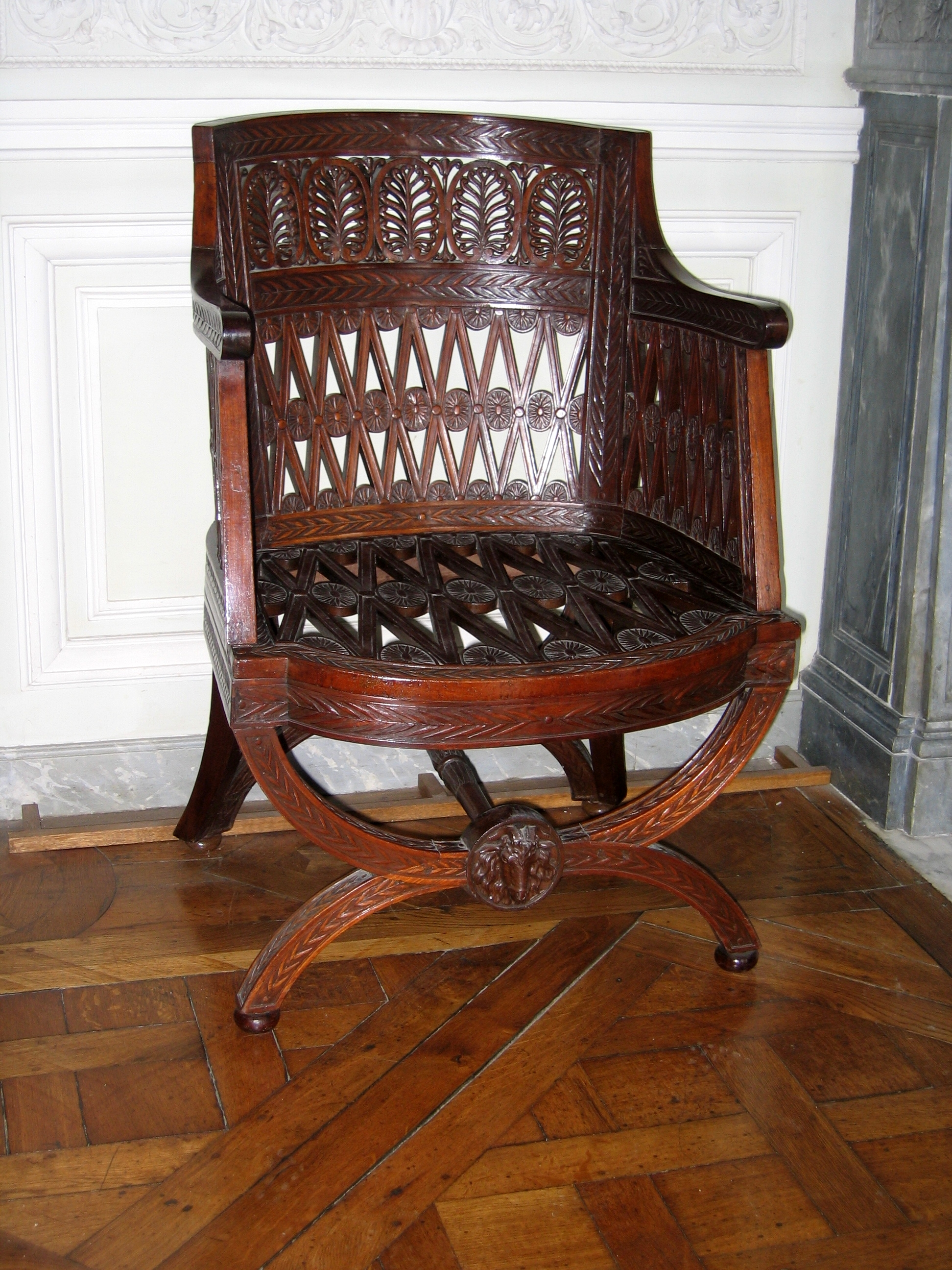
"Etruscan" chair for Petit Trianon by Hubert Robert and Georges Jacob (1787), Palace of Versailles

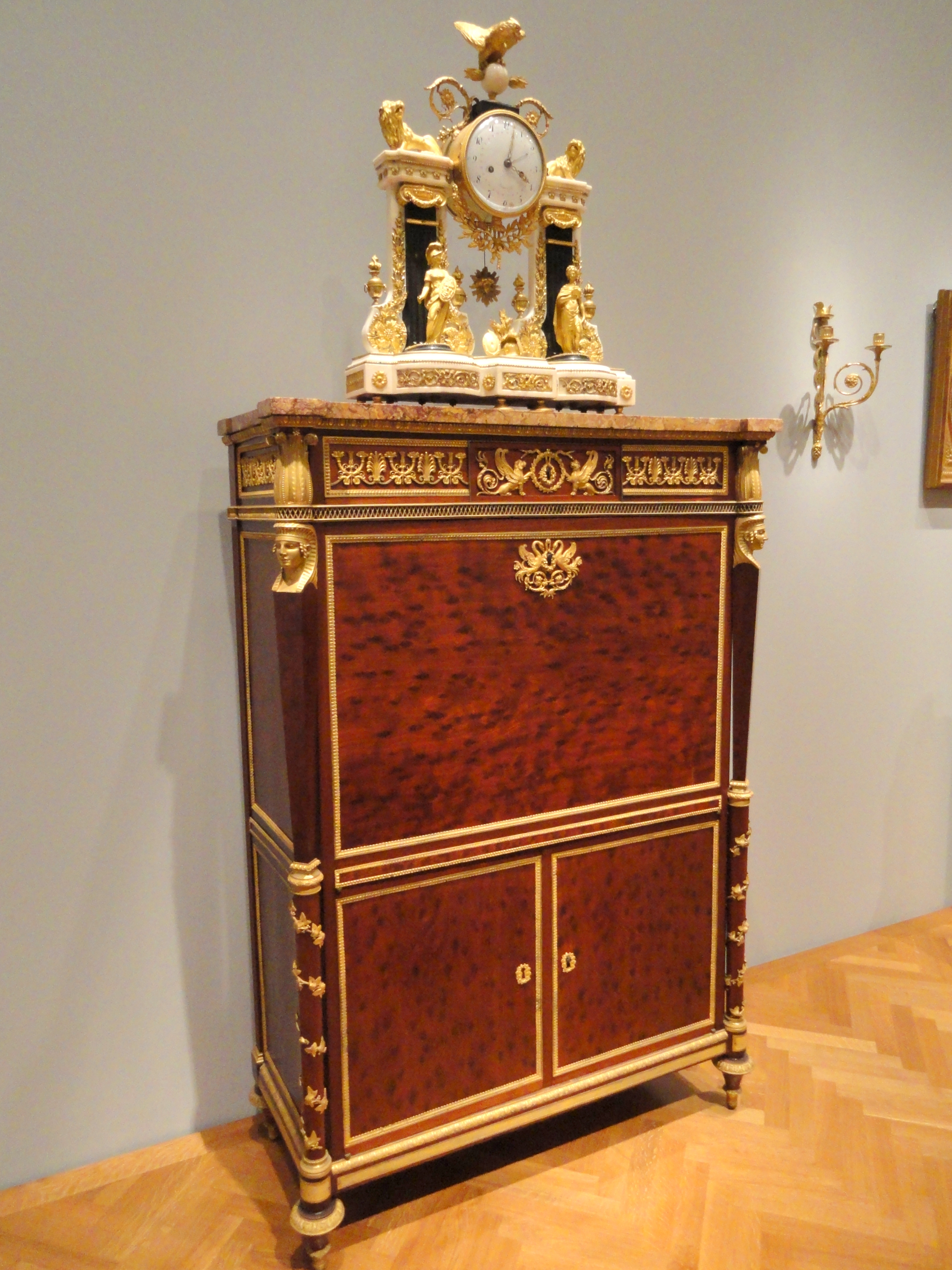
Secretaire by Bernard Molitor (c. 1800), Cleveland Museum of Art

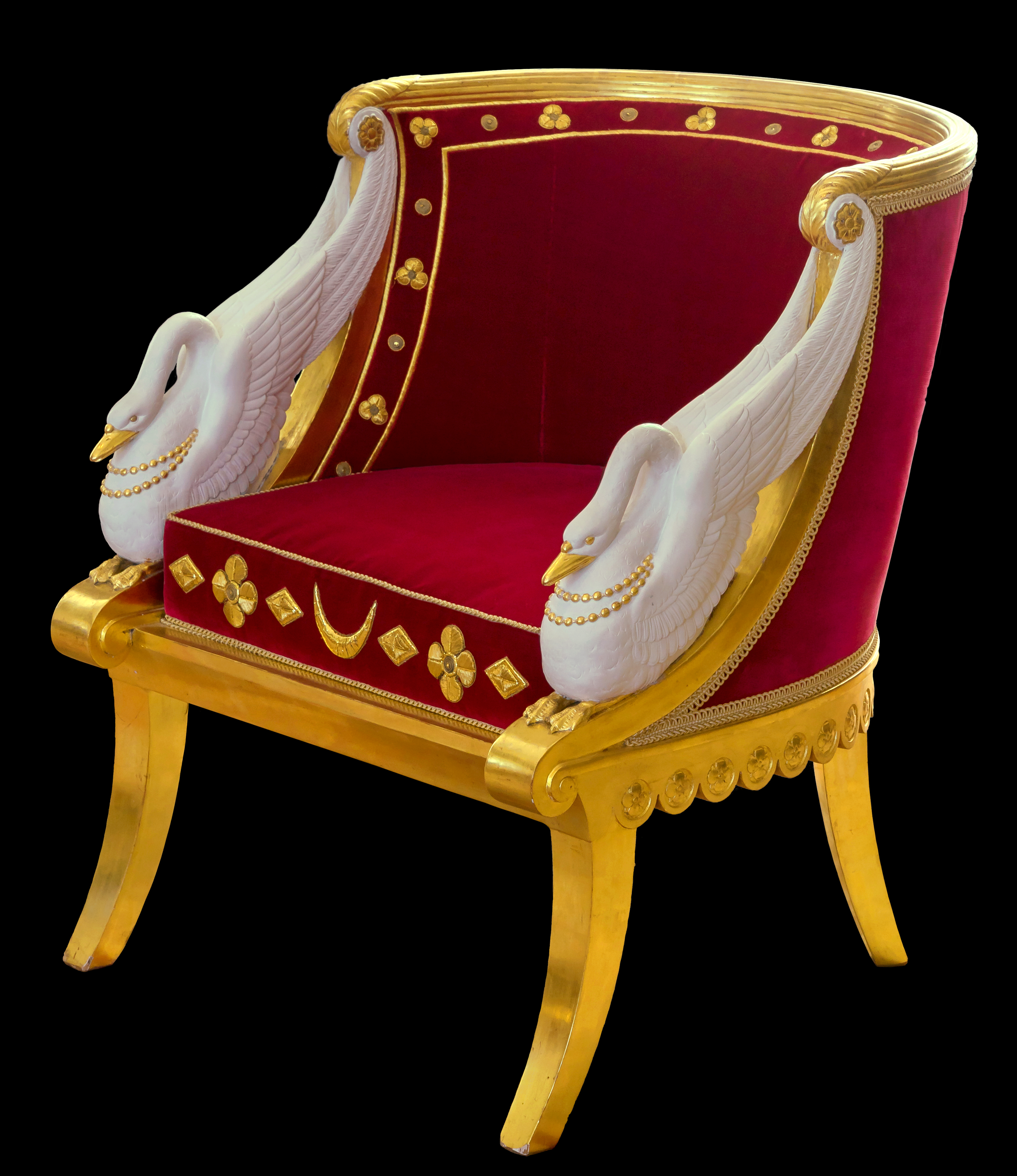
Swan armchair for Empress Joséphine, by Georges Jacob (1804) Château de Malmaison

The furniture craft was upended by the French Revolution; the aristocratic clients fled, and the furniture of the royal palaces was sold in enormous auctions; a large part went abroad. One positive development for furniture-makers was the abolition of the old guild rules; after 1791 the makers of furniture frames could collaborate with those who did the marquetry inlay. The Etruscan taste disappeared, but the neoclassic style flourished under the French Directory (1793–99), the French Consulate (1799–1804), and the Empire of Napoleon Bonaparte.

The last leading furniture designer for Louis XVI, Georges Jacob, formed a new firm with his two brothers, and, between 1796 and 1803, became the most prominent designer of the later neoclassical period. He made an effort to find classical forms that were more authentic. The type of Greek chair called the klismos became especially popular; Jacob produced a variety of neoclassical divans and stools, as well as the Lit de Repos, or day bed, which appeared in Jacques-Louis David's Portrait of Madame Récamier. Another popular form was the folding stool, modeled after those that were used in Roman army encampments. After Napoleon's invasion of Egypt in 1798, Egyptian designs, in stylized geometric form, appeared on furniture. Gilded bronze ornaments of extremely fine craftsmanship were made in Paris workshops and exported to the royal houses of Europe. The continual European wars and blockades made it difficult to import exotic woods, and sometimes local woods such as lemon trees were used; mahogany remained the choice for prestige furniture. The master furniture craftsmen of the late Empire style included Bernard Molitor, who made the furniture for the Château de Saint Cloud, and the architects Charles Percier and Pierre-François-Léonard Fontaine, who made furniture as authentic as possible to Greek and Roman models for the residences of Napoleon and for clients of the new Napoleonic aristocracy.

== See also ==
- List of Parisian structures commissioned by Napoleon I

== Bibliography ==
- Ayers, Andrew (2004). The Architecture of Paris. Stuttgart; London: Edition Axel Menges. ISBN 9783930698967.
- de Morant, Henry (1970). Histoire des arts décoratifs. Librarie Hacahette.
- Droguet, Anne (2004). Les Styles Transition et Louis XVI. Les Editions de l'Amateur. ISBN 2-85917-406-0.
- Ducher, Robert (1988), Caractéristique des Styles, Paris: Flammarion, ISBN 2-08-011539-1
- Fierro, Alfred (1996). Histoire et dictionnaire de Paris. Robert Laffont. ISBN 2-221--07862-4.
- Prina, Francesca; Demartini, Elena (2006). Petite encylopédie de l'architecture. Paris: Solar. ISBN 2-263-04096-X.
- Hopkins, Owen (2014). Les styles en architecture. Dunod. ISBN 978-2-10-070689-1.
- Renault, Christophe (2006), Les Styles de l'architecture et du mobilier, Paris: Gisserot, ISBN 978-2-877-4746-58
- Riley, Noël (2004), Grammaire des Arts Décoratifs de la Renaissance au Post-Modernisme, Flammarion, ISBN 978-2-080-1132-76
- Summerson, John (1963). The Classical Language of Architecture. Cambridge, Massachusetts: The MIT Press. ISBN 9780262690126.
- Texier, Simon (2012), Paris- Panorama de l'architecture de l'Antiquité à nos jours, Paris: Parigramme, ISBN 978-2-84096-667-8
- Toman, Rolf (2007). Néoclassicisme et Romantisme: architecture, sculpture, peinture, dessin (in French). Ullmann. ISBN 978-3-8331-3557-6.
- Dictionnaire Historique de Paris. Le Livre de Poche. 2013. ISBN 978-2-253-13140-3.
- Vila, Marie Christine (2006). Paris Musique- Huit Siècles d'histoire. Paris: Parigramme. ISBN 978-2-84096-419-3.
- Wiegandt, Claude-Paule (2005). Le Mobilier Français- Régence -Louis XV. ISBN 2-7072-0254-1.
