= Princess Louise of Prussia (1770–1836) =

Princess Louise
- Princess Radziwiłł
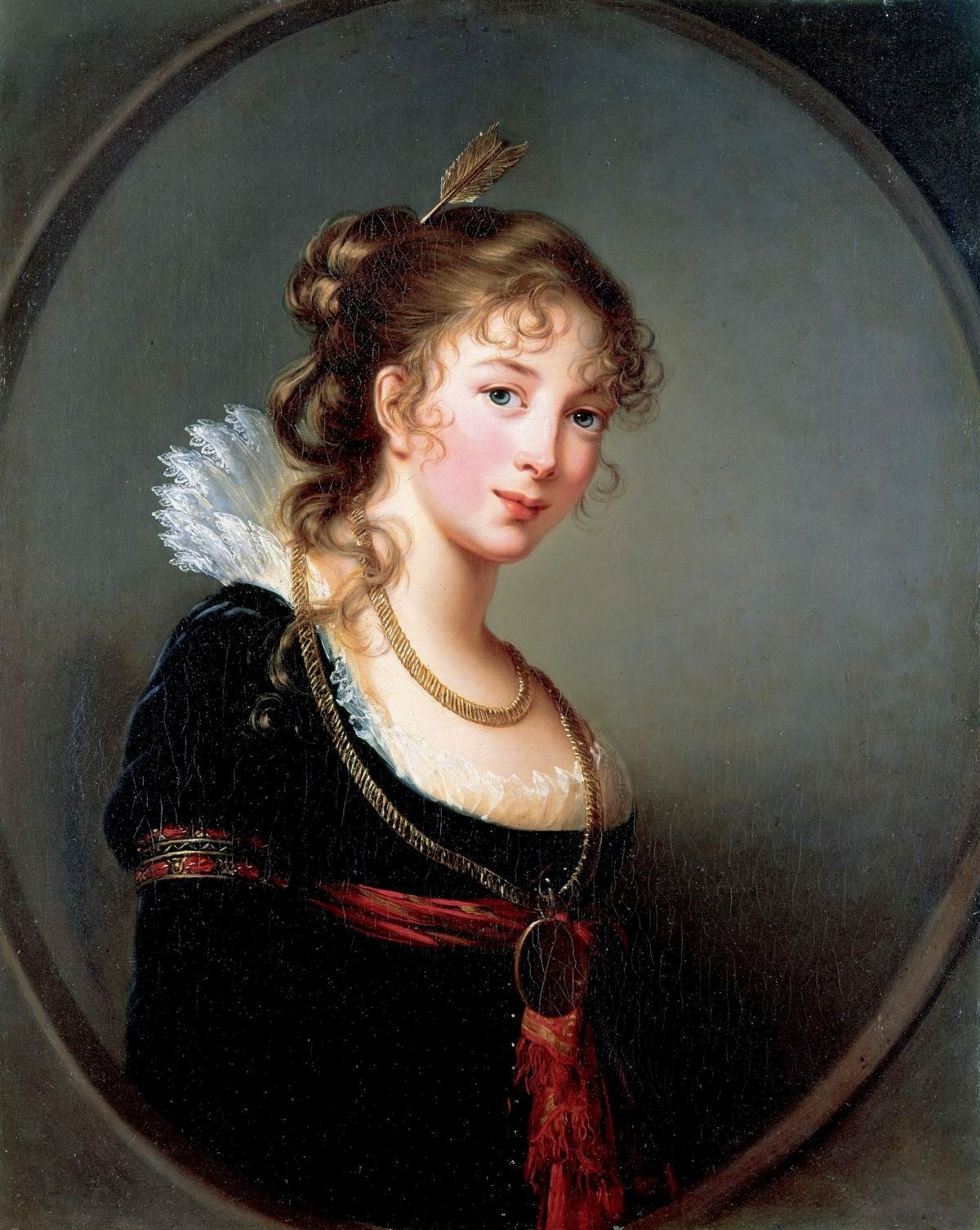
- A painting of Louise of Prussia, c. 1801; painted by Elisabeth Vigée-Lebrun
- Born: 24 May 1770; Berlin
- Died: 7 December 1836 (aged 66); Berlin
- Spouse: Antoni Radziwiłł (m. 1796; died 1833)
- Issue: Wilhelm Radziwiłł; Ferdynant Radziwiłł; Bogusław Fryderyk Radziwiłł; Władysław Radziwiłł; Elisa Radziwiłł; Wanda Radziwiłł
Names
- German: Friederike Dorothea Luise Philippine von Preußen
- House: Hohenzollern
- Father: Prince Augustus Ferdinand of Prussia
- Mother: Princess Anna Elisabeth Louise of Brandenburg-Schwedt

Princess Frederica Dorothea Louise Philippine of Prussia (24 May 1770 – 7 December 1836) was a member of the House of Hohenzollern. She was a niece of Frederick the Great, being the second daughter and third child of Prince Augustus Ferdinand of Prussia by his wife Margravine Elisabeth Louise of Brandenburg-Schwedt.

Louise and her husband, Prince Antoni Radziwiłł, were popular for their patronage of music, as well as their prominent positions in Berlin society. Louise is also notable for being the mother of Princess Elisabeth Radziwill, the childhood love of future German Emperor Wilhelm I, whose strong desire to marry her was thwarted out of considerations for Elisabeth's inequality of rank.

== Biography ==
=== Early life ===
Princess Louise was born on 24 May 1770, in the Ordenspalais (the Palace of the Order of Saint John, of which her father was head) at Berlin to Prince Augustus Ferdinand and Princess Elisabeth Louise of Prussia; her biological father may actually have been Count Friedrich Wilhelm Carl von Schmettau. Her birth was a disappointment to her family, as at the time her elder brother Friedrich Heinrich Emil Karl, Prince of Prussia (1769–1773), was the only heir to the Hohenzollern throne of her uncle Frederick the Great. Despite this, her father was devoted to her, lavishing attention, while her mother showed little affection for her. Her family would eventually come to hold seven siblings, two girls and five boys. They lived at the Friedrichsfelde estate in Berlin.

As she became older, she was given a Lutheran governess, Frau von Bielfeld; her daughter Lisette was three years older, and served as a companion to Louise. Lisette got her interested in romantic novels long before many other girls her age. Bielfeld was highly educated, but died after only five years, in October 1782. Despite Frau von Bielfeld's attention to education, Louise's studies were much neglected, and she forgot much of what had been taught her. As a consequence, Bielfeld left shortly before she died, and was replaced with her approval by a new thirty-year-old governess from the countryside, Fraulein von Keller; Louise and Keller soon formed a strong attachment. Previously, Bielfeld had found it easier to complete Louise's schoolwork and show it to her parents, thus ending in little real improvement and understanding on Louise's part. Keller on the other hand was less educated and in need of instruction, consequently imbuing in Louise a taste for study.

=== Marriage candidates ===
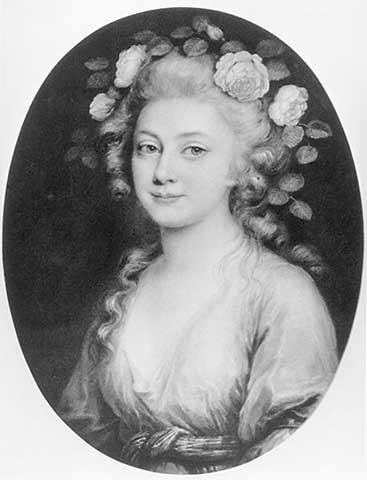
A young Princess Louise

As a niece of Frederick the Great, there were often talks of possible matches for Louise. One such candidate was Count Palatine Maximilian Joseph of Zweibrücken-Birkenfeld, the heir-presumptive of Charles Theodore, Elector of Bavaria. The Elector sent an ambassador to Friedrichsfelde in 1785, most likely to inspect Louise's general appearance and character. In the end however, Louise was considered too young, as Prince Max had wanted to marry her within the year; her father conversely refused to part from her until she was eighteen. Max soon afterwards married Princess Augusta Wilhelmine of Hesse-Darmstadt instead.

Another possible candidate was Prince Frederick, Duke of York and Albany, the second son of George III of the United Kingdom, who traveled to Berlin in 1786 to attend military maneuvers; nothing came of this however, and it was rumored that he had instead been interested in Louise's cousin Princess Wilhelmine. By her own admission, Louise remarked of the York affair, "Lacking charm and elegance, awkward from excessive shyness, I was poorly equipped to supplant my cousin. The Duke [was] a very handsome man...". Frederick later married another relative of Louise's, Princess Frederika Charlotte, who was the daughter of her cousin Frederick William II of Prussia.

=== Marriage and issue ===
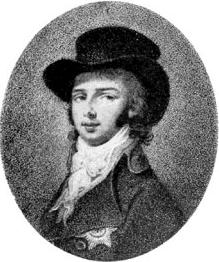
Princess Louise's husband Prince Antoni Radziwiłł, c. 1800

In April 1795, Prince Michał Hieronim Radziwiłł and his wife traveled to Berlin with their daughter Christina and son Antoni; on 1 May, they were presented at the royal court at Bellevue Palace. The Radziwiłłs were a Polish Catholic family that belonged to the oldest and most renowned of dynasties in Poland, and were also in possession of much wealth. They were great favorites with Louise's parents, and frequently dined at their home. As time went by, Louise and Antoni began to desire to marry. While many of her family members were in favor of such a match, her mother, never close with Louise, disapproved. Her parents eventually gave their full consent on the assurance that she would live near them during her marriage.

Her cousin Frederick William II of Prussia also gave his consent, pleased that the couple planned to settle in Berlin. As arrangements for their betrothal were underway however, Frederick William, having speedily and happily agreed to their marriage, surprisingly delayed his correspondence for several days. When he finally sent a letter, it read that "Prince Anton not being of a sovereign house, he could not sanction a ceremonial betrothal". Louise's parents were bitterly wounded, and blamed one of his advisers for this change of opinion. In a later letter, the king stated his support for the marriage, but had felt himself bound by his ministers' attentions to traditional etiquette and ceremony.

In 1796, Louise was duly happily married to Prince Antoni Radziwiłł. Though his family possessed wealth and rank, the marriage was nonetheless considered unequal to be matched with the House of Hohenzollern. The Swedish Princess Hedwig Elisabeth Charlotte of Holstein-Gottorp described the couple and the contemporary view around the marriage in Berlin at the time of her visit in 1798:

A witty and talented woman, a typical French "grande dame". I found it particularly interesting to make her acquaintance, as our late King had been in love with her and she could therefore have been our Queen, if he had become a widower. Her husband was well off but looked like a footman. The match was a misalliance, but as they loved each other, and as he was very wealthy, it was allowed to pass. The King, the Queen and the entire royal family however disliked her because of this marriage which, according to wicked tongues, was necessary to avoid scandal.

The couple had seven children:

| Name | Birth | Death | Notes |
|---|---|---|---|
| Wilhelm Paweł Radziwiłł | 19 March 1797 | 5 September 1870 | Prussian general, married Princess Helena Radziwill on 23 January 1825 and had no issue. Later married Countess Mathilde von Clary und Aldringen and had 6 children. |
| Ferdynant Fryderyk Radziwiłł | 13 August 1798 | 9 September 1827 | He died at age 29 at Ruhberg |
| Bogusław Fryderyk Radziwiłł | January 3, 1809 | January 2, 1873 | Prussian military officer; married Countess Leontine Gabrielle von Clary und Aldringen, younger sister of his sister-in-law, on 17 October 1832 at Ruhberg, and had 8 children. |
| Władysław Radziwiłł | 1811 | 1831 | |
| Eliza Fryderyka Radziwiłł | 28 October 1803 | 27 August 1834 | She was the beloved of William I, German Emperor, and later engaged to Prince Friedrich of Schwarzenberg, though the betrothal was dissolved. |
| Wanda Augusta Wilhelmina Radziwiłł | 29 January 1813 | 16 September 1845 | married Adam Konstanty Czartoryski on 12 December 1832 at Schmiedeberg, Germany, and had 3 children. |

=== Later life ===
The growing family took up residence at Radziwill Palace in Berlin. Louise was a happy wife, and the couple's soirees and banquets were said to be more entertaining than anything at the Prussian court. Anton, himself an excellent musician, patronized the best artists of the day; Louise warmly shared in all his interests. One visitor commented on their young family in Berlin:

Thursday evening I went for the first time to Princess Louisa's, who receives every night. She is quite adored here, and is the person who makes society here. She is ugly, but particularly pleasing, and with no sort of form about her. Her husband, Prince Radziwill, is much the most agreeable man I have ever seen here, and they have a great many beautiful children, particularly a little girl of ten years old, who is the most graceful little creature I have ever saw, and who has taken a great fancy to me. The youngest, a baby of nine months old, is beautiful.

Louise, like many other high rank ladies of the day, visited hospitals, treating soldiers during the Napoleonic Wars; sacrifices were also made by Louise and her family, such as the removal of all travel to and from Berlin, as all horses were sent to the Prussian army.

In 1815, Louise's husband was appointed Duke-Governor of the Grand Duchy of Posen, where he moved with his family. Louise partook in various social causes. Antoni's administration was unsuccessful and near powerless at preventing the Germanisation of the region, as he was caught between his Polish subjects and Prussian authorities. Shortly after the outbreak of the November Uprising he was deprived of all the powers, the Grand Duchy was abolished and its autonomy was cancelled. It was directly incorporated into Prussia and renamed the Province of Posen. Antoni returned to his palace in Berlin, where he died on April 7, 1833. He was buried in the Poznań Cathedral. His children with Louise were Germanised and never returned to Poznań; however, as owners of the manor Nieborów near Warsaw and huge family estates in today's Belarus, they paid frequent visits to other parts of Poland. Louise died three years after her husband, on 7 December 1836.

=== Her daughter and Prince Wilhelm of Prussia ===
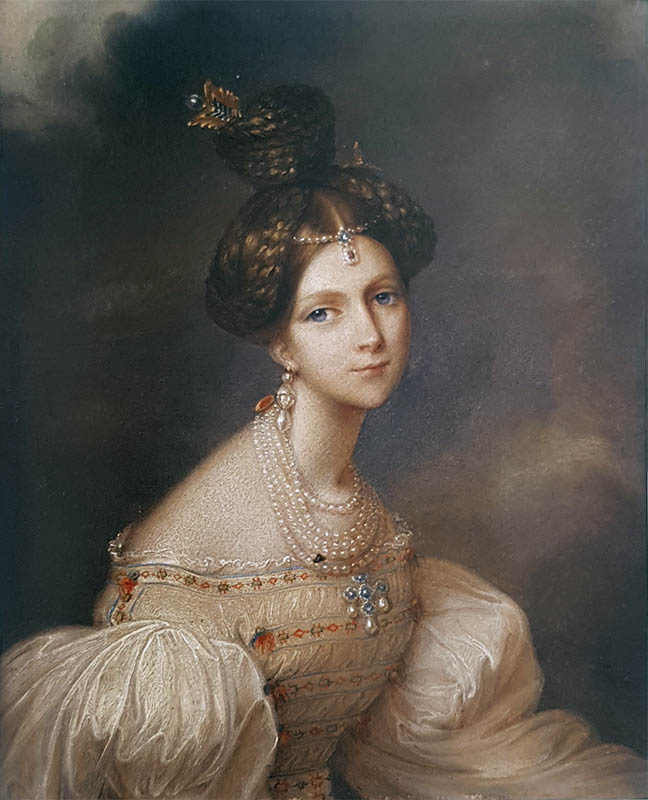
Louise's daughter Eliza

Their sons were raised as Catholics, while their daughters were raised in Louise's Calvinist faith. The children were closely brought up alongside their Hohenzollern cousins, as they were similar in age; their eldest son became the playmate of Prince Wilhelm, future Emperor of Germany. Wilhelm lived for some time in Königsberg and became greatly attached to their daughter Elisa, as she was a comfort to him during the loss of his mother in 1810; as he became older, Wilhelm desired to marry her. To boost her suitableness, there were talks of Elisa being adopted by the childless Alexander I of Russia or by her uncle Prince Augustus of Prussia, but both plans failed to win the support of all parties involved. Learned men of the Prussian court also attempted to trace her ancestry in the hopes of discovering her relation to Polish kings; this failed when others denied the claims of royal Polish ancestry. Their wish for marriage was thus denied by King Frederick William III, as she was considered of insufficient rank despite her mother's birth. Adoption to them would have been unsuitable as it would not change "the blood" of Elisa. Another factor was the influence of the Mecklenburg relations of the deceased Queen Louise in the German and Russian courts, who were not fond of Elisa's father and against the possible marriage. Furthermore, Elisa was considered insufficiently royal because her father was not a prince from a reigning or formerly reigning house, which were regarded as acceptable.

Thus, in June 1826, Wilhelm's father felt forced to demand the renunciation of a potential marriage to Elisa. Wilhelm spent the next few months looking for a more suitable bride, but did not relinquish his emotional ties to Elisa. He was sent off to the Weimar court to look for a suitable wife, where he wed Princess Augusta of Saxe-Weimar-Eisenach, fourteen years his junior on 11 June 1829. This marriage would prove to be unhappy. Wilhelm saw his cousin, Elisabeth, for the last time in 1829. She died of tuberculosis five years later, unmarried.

== Ancestry ==
Ancestors of Princess Louise of Prussia (1770–1836)

16. Frederick William, Elector of Brandenburg
8. Frederick I of Prussia
17. Countess Luise Henriette of Nassau
4. Frederick William I of Prussia
18. Ernest Augustus, Elector of Hanover
9. Sophia Charlotte of Hanover
19. Sophia of the Palatinate
2. Prince Augustus Ferdinand of Prussia
20. Ernest Augustus, Elector of Hanover
10. George I of Great Britain
21. Sophia of the Palatinate
5. Sophia Dorothea of Hanover
22. George William, Duke of Brunswick-Lüneburg
11. Sophia Dorothea of Celle
23. Eleonore d'Esmier d'Olbreuse
1. Princess Louise of Prussia
24. Frederick William I, Elector of Brandenburg
12. Philip William, Margrave of Brandenburg-Schwedt
25. Sophia Dorothea of Schleswig-Holstein-Sonderburg-Glücksburg
6. Frederick William, Margrave of Brandenburg-Schwedt
26. John George II, Prince of Anhalt-Dessau
13. Princess Johanna Charlotte of Anhalt-Dessau
27. Countess Henriette Catherine of Nassau
3. Margravine Elisabeth Louise of Brandenburg-Schwedt
28. Frederick I of Prussia = 8
14. Frederick William I of Prussia = 4
29. Sophia Charlotte of Hanover = 9
7. Princess Sophia Dorothea of Prussia
30. George I of Great Britain = 10
15. Sophia Dorothea of Hanover = 5
31. Sophia Dorothea of Celle = 11

== Sources ==
- Westmorland, Countess Priscilla Anne Wellesley Pole Fane (2009). The letters of Lady Burghersh: (afterwards Countess of Westmorland) From Germany and France During the Campaign of 1813-14. Cornell University Library. ISBN 978-1-112-58028-4.
- Fleming, Patricia H. (June 1973). "The Politics of Marriage Among Non-Catholic European Royalty". Current Anthropology. 14 (3): 231–249. doi:10.1086/201323. S2CID 144634148.
- Kasson, John A. (April 1888). "The Hohenzollern Kaiser". The North American Review. 146 (377): 361–378.
- Louise Radziwill, Alfred Richard Allison (2009). Forty Five Years of My Life. Bibliolife, LLC. ISBN 978-1-113-72511-0.
- Strauss, Gustave Louis Maurice (2008). Emperor William: The Life of a Great King and Good Man. BiblioLife, LLC. ISBN 978-0-559-67584-3.
- Tschudi, Clara (2009). Augusta, Empress of Germany. BiblioLife, LLC. ISBN 978-1-113-51294-9.
