= Prince Augustus of Prussia =

Prussian general (1779–1843)

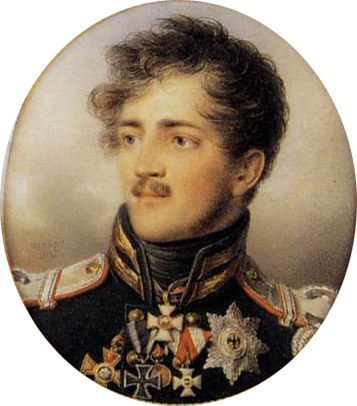
- Portrait by Jean-Baptiste Isabey, 1814
- Born: 19 September 1779; Friedrichsfelde, Kingdom of Prussia
- Died: 19 July 1843 (aged 63); Bromberg, Kingdom of Prussia
- Burial: Berlin Cathedral
Names
- Friedrich Wilhelm Heinrich August
- House: Hohenzollern
- Father: Prince August Ferdinand of Prussia
- Mother: Margravine Elisabeth Louise of Brandenburg-Schwedt

Prince Frederick William Henry Augustus of Prussia (German: Friedrich Wilhelm Heinrich August; 19 September 1779 – 19 July 1843) was a Prussian royal and general. Born at Friedrichsfelde Palace, he was the youngest son of Prince Augustus Ferdinand of Prussia, the brother of King Frederick the Great, and Margravine Elisabeth Louise of Brandenburg-Schwedt.

== Military career ==
August joined the Prussian army as a young man, earning the rank of captain by eighteen years old. In 1803, he became a major and was granted an infantry battalion of his own. Three years later, now a lieutenant colonel, he and his battalion took part in the Battle of Auerstedt. His brother, Prince Louis Ferdinand, had been killed by the French army under Napoleon I four days earlier. August himself was captured and held by the French until 1807.

In March 1808, his cousin, King Frederick William III of Prussia, made him brigadier general. The Prince spent the next five years reorganizing the Prussian artillery together with Gerhard von Scharnhorst. Seven years after the failure of the Prussian army at Auerstedt, the Prince distinguished himself at the Battle of Leipzig. He continued his campaign against Napoleon throughout 1814. In the winter 1814-1815, August attended the Congress of Vienna. He moved to the north of France in June 1818 and then back to Berlin after the war had ended.

He spent his last years inspecting artillery units in various garrison towns. He died suddenly in Bromberg during one such trip, and was buried in Berlin Cathedral in a service accompanied by the Staats- und Dom Choir Berlin.

== Relationships and estate ==
Although he was one of the richest landowners in Prussia, his estates reverted to the Crown upon his death, since he never left any legitimate heirs. His first mistress, Karoline Friederike Wichmann, with whom he cohabited from 1805 until 1817, bore him four children. She was ennobled as Baroness von Waldenburg. His second mistress was Auguste Arend, later ennobled as Baroness von Prillwitz. They were together from 1818 until her death in 1834, and had seven children. Shortly after Baroness Von Prillwitz's death he began a relationship with and morganatically married Emilie von Ostrowska, a Polish noblewoman. They had a daughter, Charlotte, who was five when her father died, and was raised by her father's Jewish tailor.

== Honours ==
He received the following orders and decorations:

- Kingdom of Prussia:
  - Knight of the Black Eagle, 19 August 1786
  - Iron Cross (1813), 2nd Class
  - Service Award Cross
- Austrian Empire:
  - Knight of the Military Order of Maria Theresa, 1813
  - Grand Cross of St. Stephen, 1837
- Brunswick: Grand Cross of Henry the Lion
- Kingdom of Hanover:
  - Grand Cross of the Royal Guelphic Order, 1839
  - Knight of St. George, 1839
- Hohenzollern: Cross of Honour of the Princely House Order of Hohenzollern, 1st Class
- Kingdom of Sardinia: Knight of the Annunciation, 30 October 1832
- Russian Empire:
  - Knight of St. Andrew, 20 January 1809
  - Knight of St. Alexander Nevsky, 20 January 1809
  - Knight of St. Anna, 1st Class, 20 January 1809
  - Knight of St. Vladimir, 2nd Class, 7 October 1813
  - Knight of St. George, 2nd Class, 10 January 1817
- Two Sicilies: Knight of St. Januarius, 1834

== Ancestry ==
Ancestors of Prince Augustus of Prussia

16. Frederick William, Elector of Brandenburg
8. Frederick I of Prussia
17. Countess Luise Henriette of Nassau
4. Frederick William I of Prussia
18. Ernest Augustus, Elector of Hanover
9. Sophia Charlotte of Hanover
19. Sophia of the Palatinate
2. Prince Augustus Ferdinand of Prussia
20. Ernest Augustus, Elector of Hanover
10. George I of Great Britain
21. Sophia of the Palatinate
5. Sophia Dorothea of Hanover
22. George William, Duke of Brunswick-Lüneburg
11. Sophia Dorothea of Celle
23. Eleonore d'Esmier d'Olbreuse
1. Prince Augustus of Prussia
24. Frederick William I, Elector of Brandenburg
12. Philip William, Margrave of Brandenburg-Schwedt
25. Sophia Dorothea of Schleswig-Holstein-Sonderburg-Glücksburg
6. Frederick William, Margrave of Brandenburg-Schwedt
26. John George II, Prince of Anhalt-Dessau
13. Princess Johanna Charlotte of Anhalt-Dessau
27. Countess Henriette Catherine of Nassau
3. Margravine Elisabeth Louise of Brandenburg-Schwedt
28. Frederick I of Prussia = 8
14. Frederick William I of Prussia = 4
29. Sophia Charlotte of Hanover = 9
7. Princess Sophia Dorothea of Prussia
30. George I of Great Britain = 10
15. Sophia Dorothea of Hanover = 5
31. Sophia Dorothea of Celle = 11
