= Prince Louis Ferdinand of Prussia (1772–1806) =

Prince of Prussia and composer

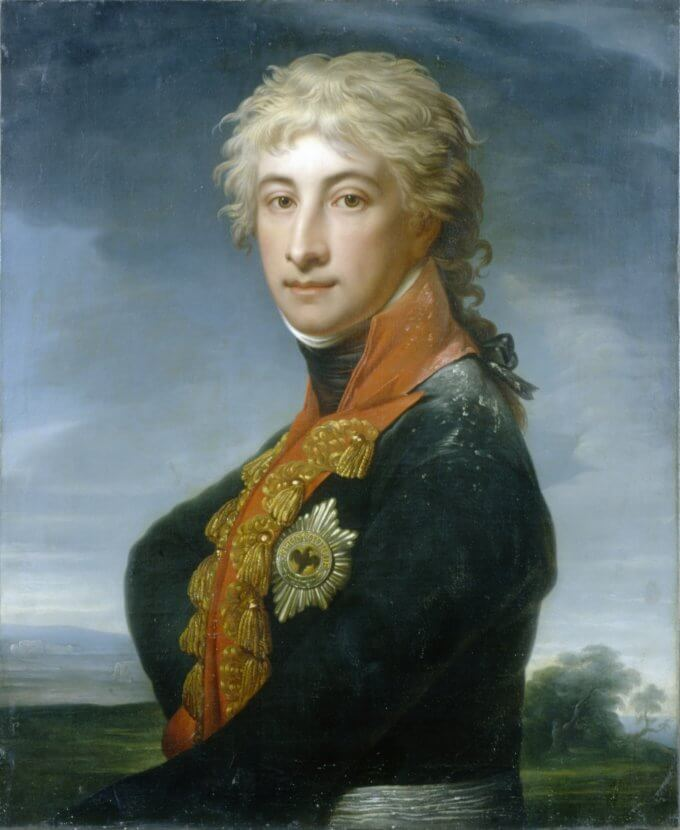
- Portrait by Jean-Laurent Mosnier, 1799
- Born: 18 November 1772; Friedrichsfelde Palace, Berlin
- Died: 10 October 1806 (aged 33); Saalfeld
- Issue: Ludwig von Wildenbruch (illegitimate)
Names
- German: Friedrich Ludwig Christian; English: Frederick Louis Christian
- House: House of Hohenzollern
- Father: Prince August Ferdinand of Prussia
- Mother: Elisabeth Louise of Brandenburg-Schwedt

Prince Frederick Louis Christian "Ferdinand" of Prussia (German: Friedrich Ludwig Christian; 18 November 1772 – 10 October 1806), was a Prussian prince, soldier, composer and pianist. Prince Louis Ferdinand fought in the Napoleonic Wars. The 1927 German film Prinz Louis Ferdinand depicts his life.

== Early life ==
Louis Ferdinand was born on 18 November 1772 in Friedrichsfelde Palace, near Berlin. He was a son of Prince August Ferdinand of Prussia and Elisabeth Louise of Brandenburg-Schwedt, and was a nephew of King Frederick the Great. He was given the baptismal name Friedrich Ludwig Christian, but was known as Louis and was soon given the nickname Ferdinand (after his father), so that he could be distinguished from his cousin, also named Louis, Prince Friedrich Ludwig Karl of Prussia (1773–1796).

== Military career ==
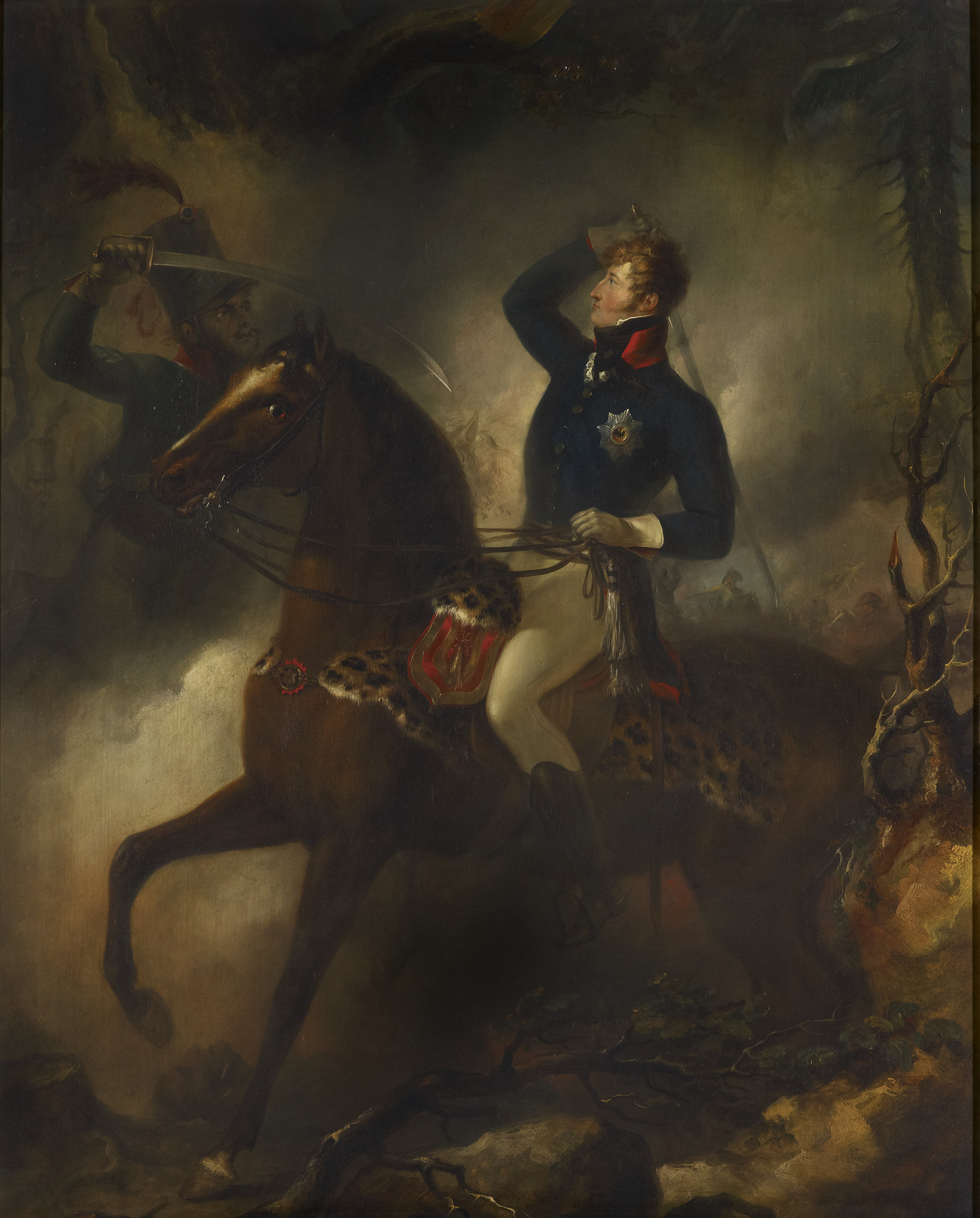
The Death of Prince Louis Ferdinand of Prussia, by Peter Edward Stroehling

Louis Ferdinand participated in the French Revolutionary Wars, fighting in the War of the First Coalition in 1792 to 1794 near Longwy and Verdun, took part in the Valmy cannonade and was wounded during the Siege of Mainz. Newly promoted to major general, he took part in the Battle of Kaiserslautern in November 1793. On 23 February 1795 Louis Ferdinand was appointed chief of the “von Baden” infantry regiment. From the end of May 1796, he served as a brigadier to the corps of his cousin, which was intended to cover the demarcation line in Westphalia. On the occasion of the military review at Petershagen, Louis Ferdinand was promoted to lieutenant general on 2 June 1799, with a patent from 20 May 1799.

In 1806, he was one of the principal advocates of resuming the war against Napoleon and the First French Empire, triggering the War of the Fourth Coalition.

He died during the opening engagement of the war, at the Battle of Saalfeld. Louis Ferdinand was in command of 8,300 men when he advanced against marshall Jean Lannes' V Corps as they attempted to break out from the passes of Thuringian Forest. In that battle, he engaged a much larger French force (12,800 men), led by Lannes himself. The French held the high ground, while the Prussians had the Saale River behind their backs, which would make a retreat difficult. When he saw his forces beginning to rout, Louis Ferdinand charged the French cavalry. He was killed in combat by Jean-Baptiste Guindey, quartermaster of the French 10th Hussars, after Louis Ferdinand refused an offer to surrender and wounded the French NCO. As a prominent leader of the Prussian court, his death was deeply felt.

== Musical activities ==
Apart from being a soldier, Louis Ferdinand was also a gifted musician and composer. Johann Friedrich Reichardt, Kapellmeister to Frederick the Great and Frederick William II, considered him a great pianist. Early on Louis Ferdinand also started to compose music, but he was not recognized for his compositional activities until later. His early pieces were performed by the orchestra of Prince Henry, the younger brother of Fredrick the Great. Later on, Prince Louis Ferdinand joined several salons in Berlin, where he frequently improvised on the piano. Among his circle of acquaintances were figures such as Schlegel, Wackenroder, and Tieck, all of whom were highly interested in music. Ludwig van Beethoven dedicated his Third Piano Concerto to him, a sign of high esteem for his piano playing. Anton Reicha's massive variation cycle, L'art de varier, was also written for Louis Ferdinand.

Due to his early death, there are only 13 published musical compositions by Louis Ferdinand with opus number. Most are chamber works, with the exception of the two rondos for piano and orchestra (Op. 9 and 13). Like Chopin, all of his surviving works feature the piano. Despite his limited oeuvre, Louis Ferdinand's music was innovative for his time, in a style that was more expressive and individualistic than the prevailing Classical mode, and he is widely considered to be a pioneering composer of the Romantic movement; Robert Schumann, for example, called him "that most Romantic of all princes". His close friendships with Tieck, Schlegel, and Wackenroder, all founding figures of German Romanticism, may have had an influence on his worldview and consequently his music.

In 1842, Franz Liszt wrote an Élégie sur des motifs du Prince Louis Ferdinand de Prusse, S. 168, for piano solo.

== Musical works ==
The following is a complete list of compositions by Prince Louis Ferdinand with opus numbers:

- Op. 1: Piano Quintet in C minor (published 1803)
- Op. 2: Piano Trio No. 1 in A♭ major (published 1806)
- Op. 3: Piano Trio No. 2 in E♭ major (published 1806)
- Op. 4: Andante with Variations in B♭ major for piano quartet (published 1806)
- Op. 5: Piano Quartet No. 1 in E♭ major (published 1806)
- Op. 6: Piano Quartet No. 2 in F minor (published 1806)
- Op. 7: Fugue in G minor for piano (published 1807)
- Op. 8: Notturno in F major for flute, 2 horns and piano quartet (published 1808)
- Op. 9: Rondo No. 1 in B♭ major for piano and orchestra (published 1808)
- Op. 10: Piano Trio No. 3 in E♭ major (published 1806)
- Op. 11: Larghetto with Variations in G major for piano quintet (published 1806)
- Op. 12: Octet in F minor for clarinet, 2 horns, 2 violins, 2 cellos and piano (published 1808)
- Op. 13: Rondo No. 2 in E♭ major for piano and orchestra (published 1823)

== Family ==
Ludwig von Wildenbruch was the elder of two illegitimate children born to Henriette Fromme.

== Ancestry ==
Ancestors of Prince Louis Ferdinand of Prussia (1772–1806)

16. Frederick William, Elector of Brandenburg
8. Frederick I of Prussia
17. Countess Luise Henriette of Nassau
4. Frederick William I of Prussia
18. Ernest Augustus, Elector of Hanover
9. Sophia Charlotte of Hanover
19. Sophia of the Palatinate
2. Prince Augustus Ferdinand of Prussia
20. Ernest Augustus, Elector of Hanover
10. George I of Great Britain
21. Sophia of the Palatinate
5. Sophia Dorothea of Hanover
22. George William, Duke of Brunswick-Lüneburg
11. Sophia Dorothea of Celle
23. Eleonore d'Esmier d'Olbreuse
1. Prince Louis Ferdinand of Prussia
24. Frederick William I, Elector of Brandenburg
12. Philip William, Margrave of Brandenburg-Schwedt
25. Sophia Dorothea of Schleswig-Holstein-Sonderburg-Glücksburg
6. Frederick William, Margrave of Brandenburg-Schwedt
26. John George II, Prince of Anhalt-Dessau
13. Princess Johanna Charlotte of Anhalt-Dessau
27. Countess Henriette Catherine of Nassau
3. Margravine Elisabeth Louise of Brandenburg-Schwedt
28. Frederick I of Prussia = 8
14. Frederick William I of Prussia = 4
29. Sophia Charlotte of Hanover = 9
7. Princess Sophia Dorothea of Prussia
30. George I of Great Britain = 10
15. Sophia Dorothea of Hanover = 5
31. Sophia Dorothea of Celle = 11
