= Princess Philippine of Brandenburg-Schwedt =

Landgravine of Hesse-Kassel (1745–1800)

Philippine of Brandenburg-Schwedt
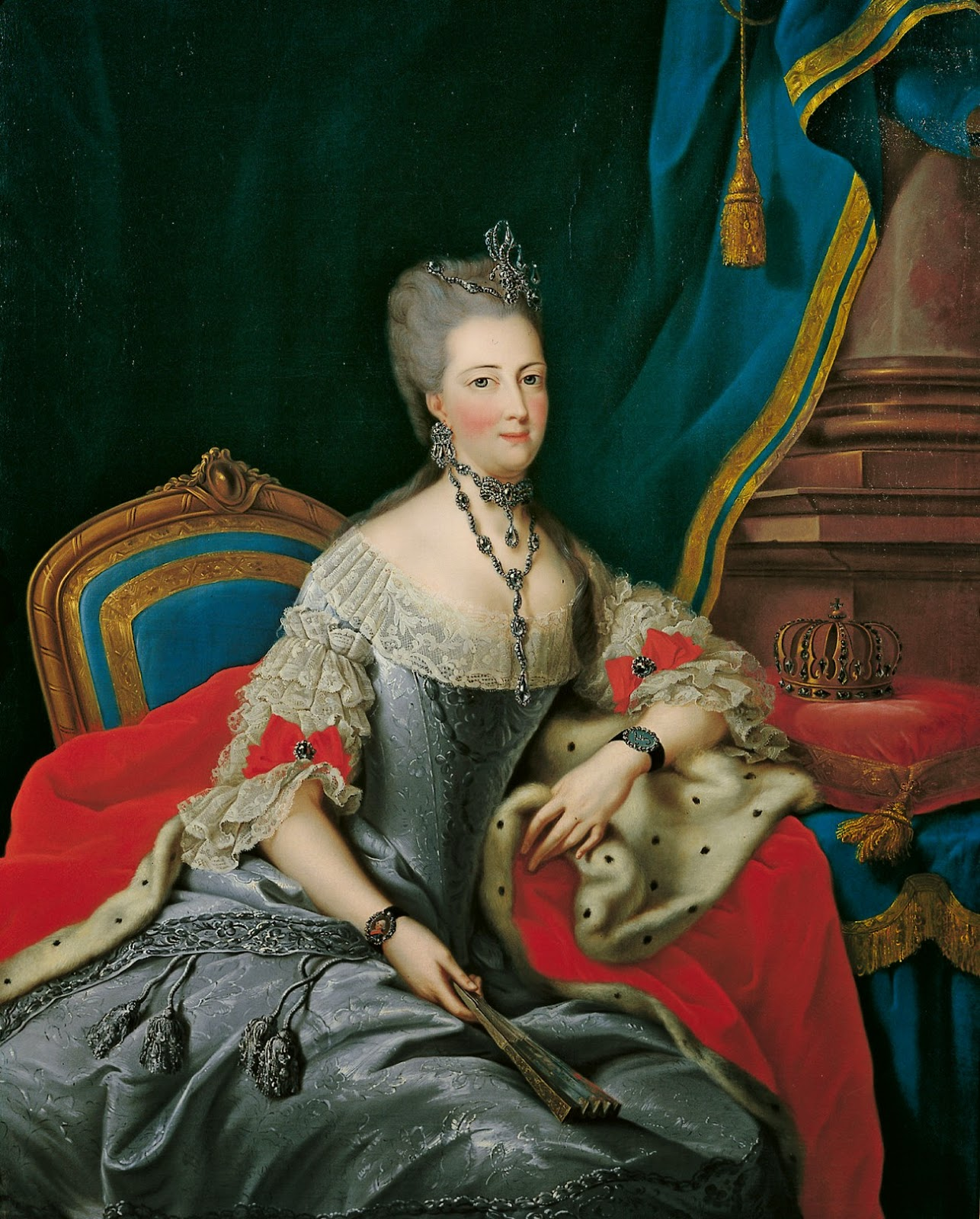
- Portrait by Johann Heinrich Tischbein, c. 1773

Landgravine consort of Hesse-Kassel
- Tenure: 10 January 1773 – 31 October 1785
- Born: 10 October 1745; Schwedt
- Died: 1 May 1800 (aged 54); Berlin
- Spouse: Frederick II, Landgrave of Hesse-Kassel (m. 1773; died 1785) Georg Ernst Levin von Wintzingerode (m. 1794)
Names
- German: Philippine Auguste Amalie
- House: Hohenzollern
- Father: Frederick William, Margrave of Brandenburg-Schwedt
- Mother: Princess Sophia Dorothea of Prussia

Margravine Philippine Auguste Amalie of Brandenburg-Schwedt (10 October 1745 – 1 May 1800) was a Landgravine consort of Hesse-Kassel by marriage to Frederick II, Landgrave of Hesse-Kassel.

== Life ==
Philippine was one of five children born to Margrave Frederick William of Brandenburg-Schwedt and his wife Princess Sophia Dorothea of Prussia. Her siblings included Friederike Dorothea, Duchess of Württemberg and Elisabeth Louise, Princess of Prussia.

=== Landgravine of Hesse-Kassel ===
Philippine was very early on chosen by her aunt, Queen Louisa Ulrika of Sweden, as the future queen of Sweden; her mother was the queen's favourite, and Louisa Ulrika wished Philippine to marry her son, Gustav (later Gustav III of Sweden). These plans were broken however when Gustav was married to Sophia Magdalena of Denmark in 1766. Louisa Ulrika then wanted Philippine to marry her younger son, Charles, but instead, Gustav decided that his brother should marry Hedwig Elizabeth Charlotte of Holstein-Gottorp.

On 10 January 1773, Philippine married Frederick II, Landgrave of Hesse-Kassel, who was 25 years older, in Berlin. She was his second wife; his first wife, Princess Mary of Great Britain, died the previous year. Philippine thus became stepmother to Frederick's three surviving sons: William, Charles, and Frederick. Philippine would not produce any legitimate children herself however.

During her marriage, Philippine led a widely independent life, even setting up her own court. On 1 March 1777, she gave birth to an illegitimate son, Georg Philippson, fathered by the later Württemberg statesman Georg Ernst Levin von Wintzingerode. She also helped reconcile her husband with his children from his first marriage, from whom he had been estranged since 1754.

=== Later life ===
Frederick died on 31 October 1785. As a widow, she lived first in Hanau. After the invasion of the French revolutionary army she moved to Berlin. King Frederick William II donated a modern palace to her (Behrenstraße 66). In 1794, she married Count von Wintzingerode secretly with knowledge and approval of the king. Philippine died on 1 May 1800. She is buried in Berlin Cathedral. The only heir was her second husband Wintzingerode.

== Legacy ==
Three places, all established in 1778 and incorporated into Wolfhagen in 1971, are named after Philippine:

- Philippinenburg (in German)
- Philippinendorf (in German)
- Philippinenthal (in German)

== Ancestry ==
Ancestors of Princess Philippine of Brandenburg-Schwedt

8. Frederick William I, Elector of Brandenburg
4. Philip William, Margrave of Brandenburg-Schwedt
9. Sophia Dorothea of Schleswig-Holstein-Sonderburg-Glücksburg
2. Frederick William, Margrave of Brandenburg-Schwedt
10. John George II, Prince of Anhalt-Dessau
5. Princess Johanna Charlotte of Anhalt-Dessau
11. Henriette Catherine of Nassau
1. Philippine of Brandenburg-Schwedt
12. Frederick I of Prussia
6. Frederick William I of Prussia
13. Sophia Charlotte of Hanover
3. Sophia Dorothea of Prussia
14. George I of Great Britain
7. Sophia Dorothea of Hanover
15. Sophia Dorothea of Celle

Princess Philippine of Brandenburg-Schwedt House of Brandenburg-Schwedt Cadet branch of the House of Hohenzollern Born: 5 March 1723 Died: 14 January 1772
German royalty
Vacant Title last held by Mary of Great Britain	Landgravine consort of Hesse-Kassel; 10 January 1773 – 31 October 1785	Succeeded by Wilhelmina Caroline of Denmark
