= Princess Friederike of Brandenburg-Schwedt =

Friederike
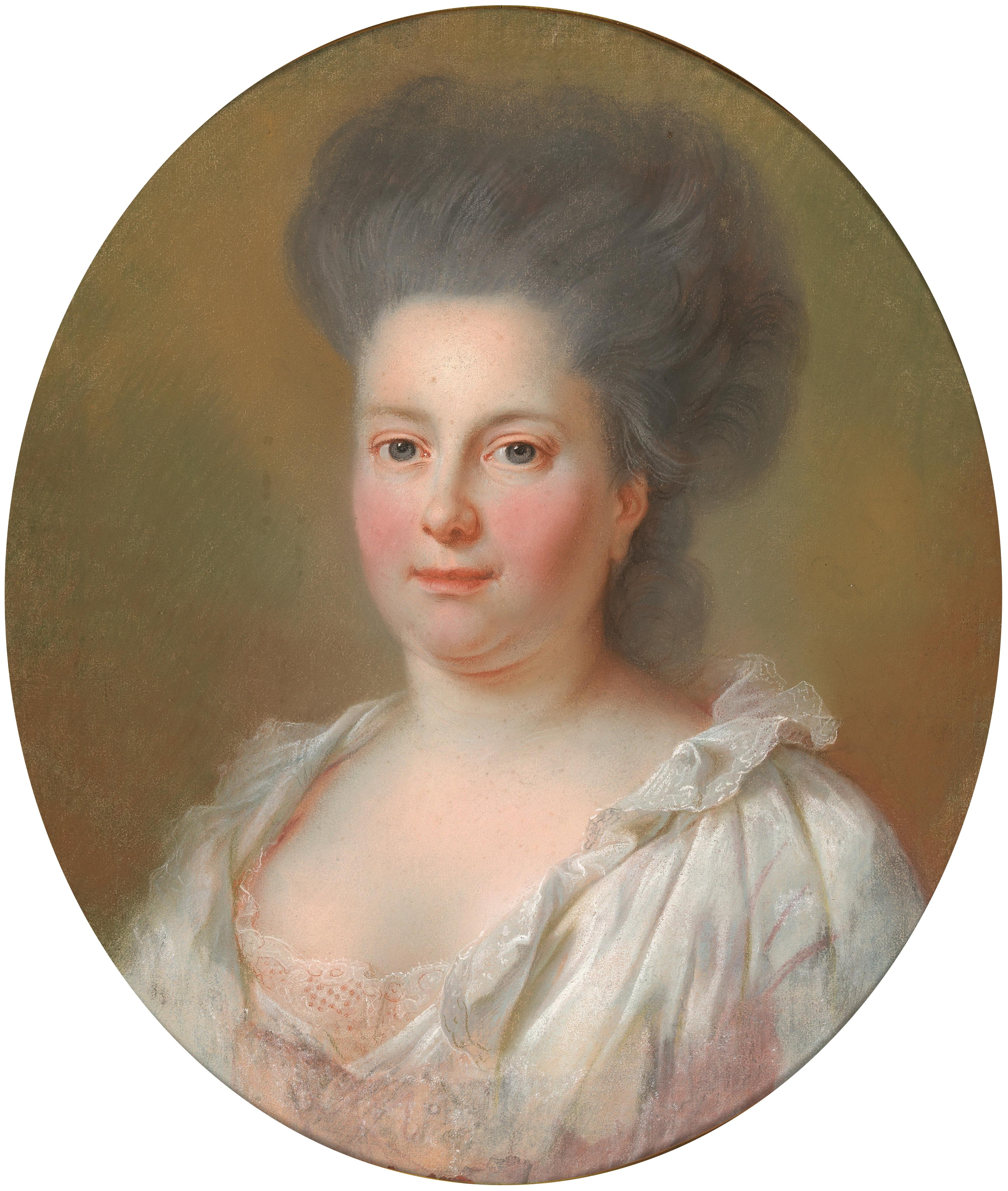
- Portrait by Johann Heinrich Wilhelm Tischbein

Duchess consort of Württemberg
- Tenure: 20 May 1795 – 23 December 1797
- Born: 18 December 1736; Schwedt
- Died: 9 March 1798 (aged 61); Stuttgart
- Spouse: Frederick II Eugene, Duke of Württemberg (m. 1753; died 1797)
- Issue: Frederick I of Württemberg; Duke Louis; Duke Eugen; Sophie Dorothea, Empress of Russia; Duke William; Duke Ferdinand; Friederica, Princess of Holstein-Gottorp; Elisabeth, Archduchess of Austria; Duke Alexander
Names
- Friederike Sophia Dorothea
- House: Hohenzollern
- Father: Frederick William, Margrave of Brandenburg-Schwedt
- Mother: Princess Sophia Dorothea of Prussia

Friederike of Brandenburg-Schwedt (Friederike Sophia Dorothea; 18 December 1736 – 9 March 1798) was Duchess of Württemberg by marriage to Frederick II Eugene, Duke of Württemberg. She is an ancestress to many European royals of the 19th and 20th centuries.

== Biography ==
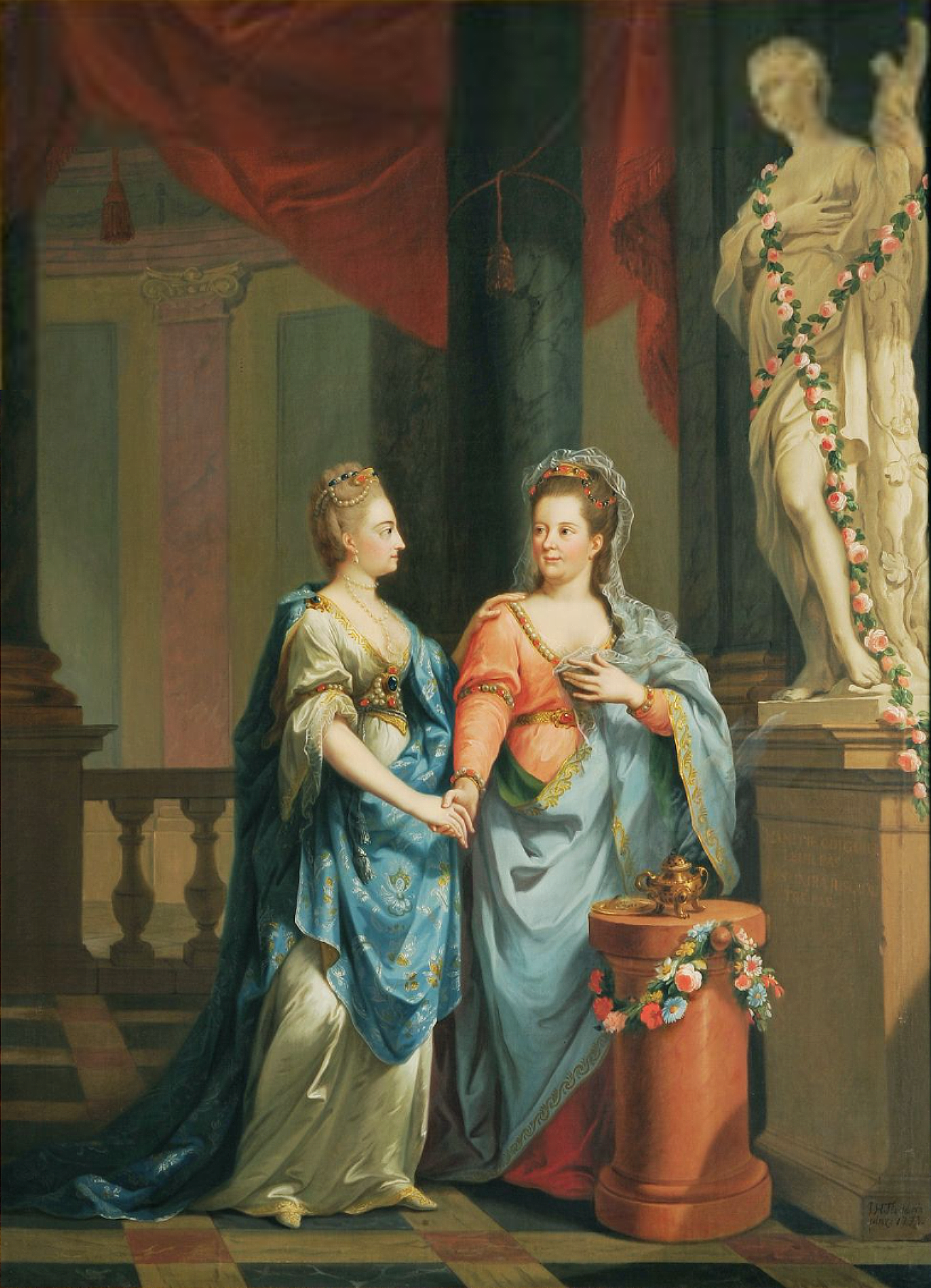
Duchess Friederike and her younger sister Landgravine Philippine, by Johann Heinrich Tischbein, 1773

Friederike was a daughter of Margrave Frederick William of Brandenburg-Schwedt and Princess Sophia Dorothea of Prussia. Her mother was a sister of Frederick the Great, thus making Friederike a niece of King Frederick. Her siblings included Elisabeth Louise, Princess Augustus Ferdinand of Prussia and Philippine, Landgravine of Hesse-Kassel.

On 2 November 1753, she married Frederick Eugene of Württemberg. He would succeed his brother in 1795, making her Duchess consort of Württemberg.

Friederike was described as witty and charming. She belonged to the reformed faith, while her husband was Catholic; however, she brought up her children as Lutheran upon agreement with the Lutheran council, from whom she received an allowance. This condition was set by King Frederick himself.

From 1769, she lived at Montbéliard, which was being managed by her husband. In 1792, she abandoned Montbéliard because of the French Revolution. Her husband inherited the Duchy of Württemberg in 1795.

== Issue ==
She and Frederick had twelve children:

- Duke Frederick Wilhelm Karl of Württemberg (6 November 1754 – 30 October 1816); succeeded his father as Duke of Württemberg; would later become the first King of Württemberg.
- Duke Louis Frederick Alexander of Württemberg (30 August 1756 – 20 September 1817)
- Duke Eugen Frederick Henry of Württemberg (21 November 1758 – 20 June 1822).
- Duchess Sophie Dorothea Marie Auguste Luise of Württemberg (25 October 1759 – 5 November 1828), married to Paul I, Emperor of Russia
- Duke William Frederick Philip of Württemberg (27 December 1761 – 10 August 1830); father of Wilhelm, 1st Duke of Urach.
- Duke Ferdinand Frederick Augustus of Württemberg (22 October 1763 – 20 January 1834)
- Duchess Friederike Elisabeth Amalie of Württemberg (27 July 1765 – 24 November 1785), married to Peter, Duke of Oldenburg.
- Duchess Elisabeth Wilhelmine Luise of Württemberg (21 April 1767 – 18 February 1790), converted to Catholicism at fifteen and married to Archduke Francis of Austria in 1788, later became Francis II, Holy Roman Emperor, after her death.
- Duchess Friederike Wilhelmine Katharina of Württemberg (3 June 1768 – 22 October 1768).
- Duke Charles Frederick Henry of Württemberg (3 May 1770 – 22 August 1791).
- Duke Alexander Frederick Charles of Württemberg (24 April 1771 – 4 July 1833), the founder of the fifth branch of Württemberg, from which today's head of the House, Duke Carl Maria of Württemberg
- Duke Charles Henry of Württemberg (3 July 1772 – 28 July 1833), married under the name "Count von Sontheim" in 1798 Christianne-Caroline Alexeï (1779–1853), who was created Baroness von Hochberg und Rottenburg in 1807 and was raised, along with her children, to the rank and title of Countess von Urach on 12 November 1825. Of their five daughters three died young, while Countess Marie von Urach (1802–1882) wed Karl, Prince of Hohenlohe-Kirchberg in 1821 and Countess Alexandrine von Urach (1803–1884) married Charles, Count Arpeau de Gallatin in 1825, from whom she was divorced in 1843.

== Honours ==
- Russian Empire: Dame Grand Cross of the Order of Saint Catherine, July 1776

== Ancestry ==
Ancestors of Princess Friederike of Brandenburg-Schwedt

8. Frederick William, Elector of Brandenburg
4. Philip William, Margrave of Brandenburg-Schwedt
9. Princess Sophia Dorothea of Schleswig-Holstein-Sonderburg-Glücksburg
2. Frederick William, Margrave of Brandenburg-Schwedt
10. John George II, Prince of Anhalt-Dessau
5. Princess Johanna Charlotte of Anhalt-Dessau
11. Countess Henriette Catherine of Nassau
1. Princess Friederike of Brandenburg-Schwedt
12. Frederick I of Prussia
6. Frederick William I of Prussia
13. Princess Sophia Charlotte of Hanover
3. Princess Sophia Dorothea of Prussia
14. George I of Great Britain
7. Princess Sophia Dorothea of Hanover
15. Princess Sophia Dorothea of Celle

== Notes ==
Princess Friederike of Brandenburg-Schwedt House of Brandenburg-Schwedt Cadet branch of the House of Hohenzollern Born: 18 December 1736 Died: 9 March 1798
German royalty
Vacant Title last held by Franziska von Hohenheim	Duchess consort of Württemberg; 20 May 1795 – 23 December 1797	Succeeded by Charlotte, Princess Royal
