= Princess Anna Elisabeth Louise of Brandenburg-Schwedt =

Anna Elisabeth Louise of Brandenburg-Schwedt
- Princess Augustus Ferdinand of Prussia
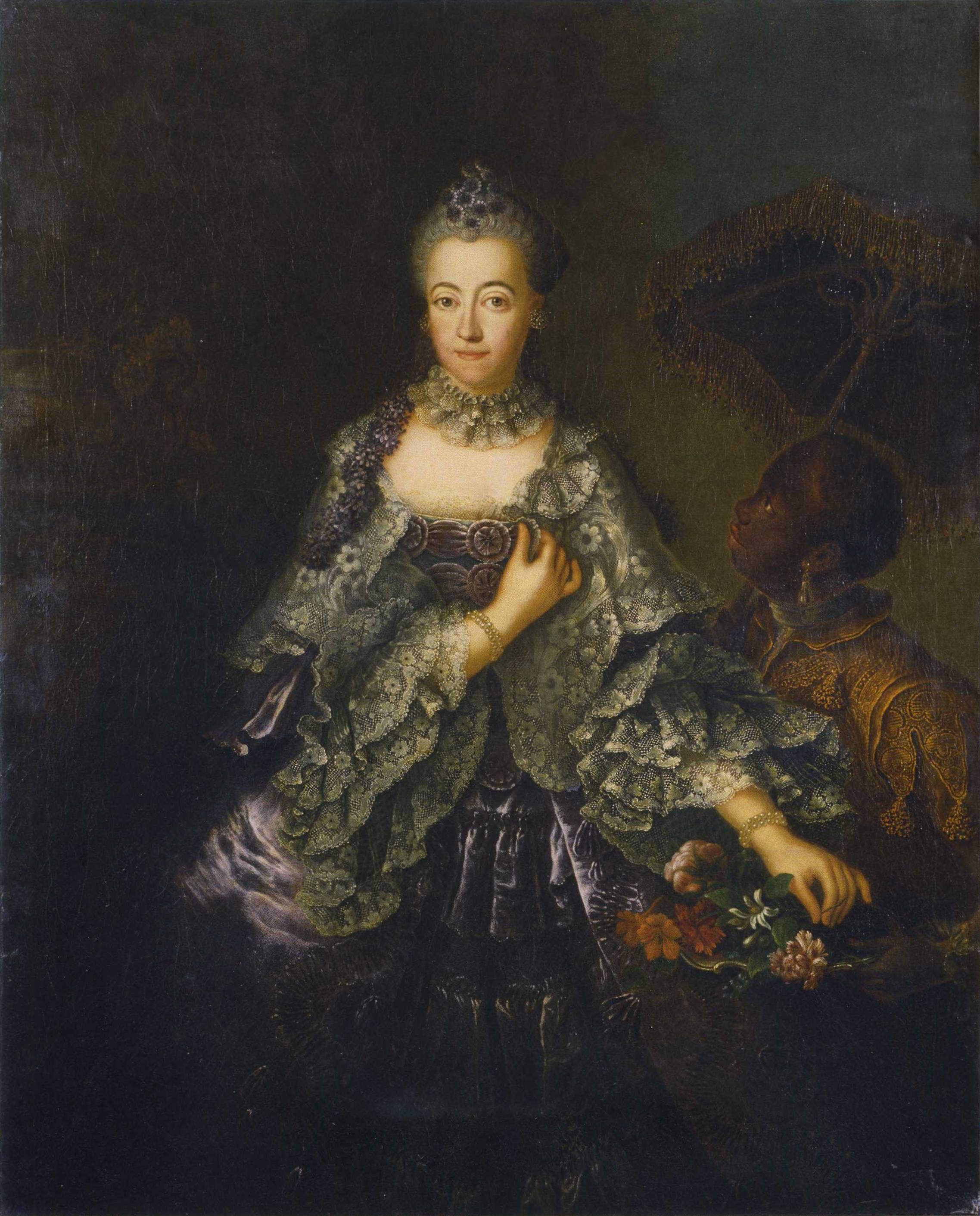
- Portrait by Anna Rosina de Gasc, 1756
- Born: 22 April 1738; Schwedt
- Died: 22 February 1820 (aged 81); Berlin, Brandenburg
- Burial: Berlin Cathedral
- Spouse: Prince Augustus Ferdinand of Prussia (m. 1755; died 1813)
- Issue: Princess Friederike; Prince Heinrich; Louise, Princess Antoni Radziwiłł; Prince Christian; Prince Louis Ferdinand; Prince Paul; Prince Augustus
Names
- German: Anna Elisabeth Luise
- House: Hohenzollern
- Father: Frederick William, Margrave of Brandenburg-Schwedt
- Mother: Princess Sophia Dorothea of Prussia

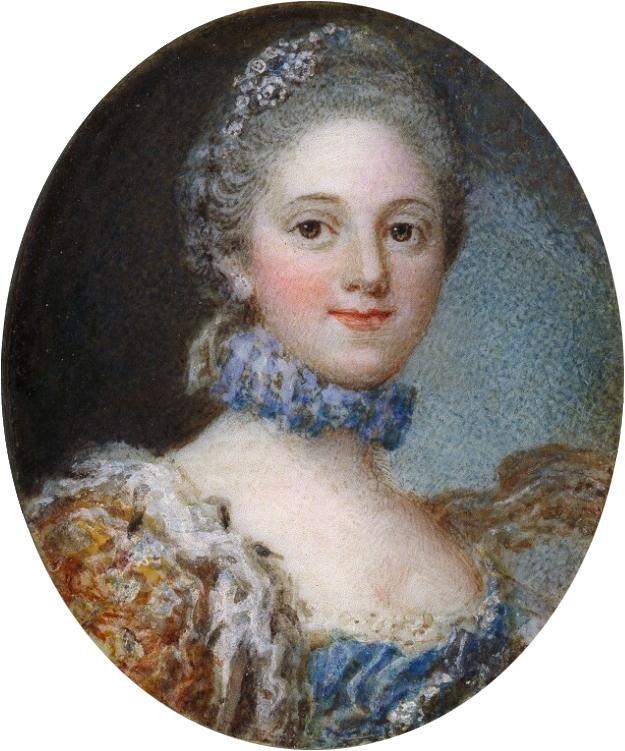
Portrait of Margravine Elisabeth Louise of Brandenburg-Schwedt spouse of Prince Augustus Ferdinand of Prussia

Princess and Margravine Anna Elisabeth Louise of Brandenburg-Schwedt (German: Luise; 22 April 1738 – 10 February 1820) was a Prussian princess by marriage to her uncle Prince Augustus Ferdinand of Prussia. She was a daughter of Margrave Frederick William of Brandenburg-Schwedt and Princess Sophia Dorothea of Prussia.

== Early life ==
Anna Elisabeth Louise was one of five children born to Margrave Frederick William of Brandenburg-Schwedt and Sophia Dorothea of Prussia. Her siblings included Sophia Dorothea, Duchess of Württemberg, and Philippine, Landgravine of Hesse-Cassel.

Her father was a son of Philip William, Margrave of Brandenburg-Schwedt and Princess Johanna Charlotte of Anhalt-Dessau.

Her mother was a daughter of Frederick William I of Prussia and Sophia Dorothea of Hanover. Through her mother, Anna Elisabeth Louise was a niece of Frederick the Great.

== Princess of Prussia ==
On 27 September 1755 in Charlottenburg Palace, Berlin, Anna Elisabeth Louise married her uncle Prince Augustus Ferdinand of Prussia, a younger brother of her mother, Sophia Dorothea. He was eight years older than she and was a younger son of Frederick William I of Prussia and Sophia Dorothea of Hanover (herself the only daughter of George I of Great Britain).

The biological father of her daughter Louise, who was born in 1770, may have been Count Friedrich Wilhelm Carl von Schmettau. Louise was described as nice, witty and kind. The Swedish Princess Hedwig Elizabeth Charlotte described her at the time of her visit in 1798:

In the afternoon, we visited this Princess, who lives at Bellevue in the outskirts of Berlin. It is a little villa, very suitable for a private person but far from royal. The reception here was quite dissimilar from the one at my aunt. Princess Ferdinand is stiff and made it obvious that she wished to impress us. I was of course polite, but after I had noticed, that she took on a condescending tone and wished to embarrass me, I replied the same way and displayed the same haughtiness. The Princess is no longer young, has surely been beautiful, looks like an aristocratic Frenchwoman but not like a Princess, for she has nothing royal about her. I do not think she is that clever, but she can make a pleasant conversation and is quite confident, as one becomes through a long habit of socializing in the grand world.

Anna Elisabeth Louise was one of the few members of the royal house to remain in Berlin during the French occupation in 1806. While most of the royal family left, reportedly because of the anti-Napoleonic criticism they had expressed, and the members of the royal court either followed them or left the capital for their country estates, Elisabeth Louise remained with her spouse and Princess Wilhelmina of Hesse-Kassel because of "their great age", as did Princess Augusta of Prussia, who was pregnant at the time.

One visitor to her in 1813–1814 commented that, "I never saw such a formal, stiff, disagreeable old woman - vieille cour outree, and she frightened me to death. I was glad to get away...".

== Death ==
Augustus Ferdinand died in Berlin on 2 May 1813. Elisabeth Louise died seven years later, on 22 February 1820. She is buried in Berlin Cathedral.

== Issue ==
On 27 September 1755 in Charlottenburg Palace, Berlin, Anna Elisabeth Louise married her uncle Prince Augustus Ferdinand of Prussia The couple had seven children:

- Friederike Elisabeth Dorothea Henriette Amalie, Princess of Prussia (1761–1773), died young
- Friedrich Heinrich Emil Karl, Prince of Prussia (1769–1773), died in infancy
- Friederike Dorothea Louise Philippine, Princess of Prussia (1770–1836), married in 1796 to Prince Antoni Radziwiłł
- Heinrich Friedrich Carl Ludwig (1771–1790), died young
- Friedrich Ludwig Christian (1772–1806), killed in action
- Friedrich Paul Heinrich August, Prince of Prussia (1776), stillborn
- Friedrich Wilhelm Heinrich August, Prince of Prussia (1779–1843)

== Ancestry ==
Ancestors of Princess Anna Elisabeth Louise of Brandenburg-Schwedt

8. Frederick William, Elector of Brandenburg
4. Philip William, Margrave of Brandenburg-Schwedt
9. Princess Sophia Dorothea of Schleswig-Holstein-Sonderburg-Glücksburg
2. Frederick William, Margrave of Brandenburg-Schwedt
10. John George II, Prince of Anhalt-Dessau
5. Princess Johanna Charlotte of Anhalt-Dessau
11. Countess Henriette Catherine of Nassau
1. Princess Anna Elisabeth Luise of Brandenburg-Schwedt
12. Frederick I of Prussia
6. Frederick William I of Prussia
13. Princess Sophia Charlotte of Hanover
3. Princess Sophia Dorothea of Prussia
14. George I of Great Britain
7. Princess Sophia Dorothea of Hanover
15. Princess Sophia Dorothea of Celle
