= Philip William =

Philip William may refer to:

- Philip William, Prince of Orange (1554–1618), Prince of Orange and Knight of the Golden Fleece
- Philip William, Elector Palatine (1615–1690), Count Palatine of Neuburg, Duke of Jülich and Berg, Elector of the Palatinate
- Philip William, Margrave of Brandenburg-Schwedt (1669–1711), Prussian Prince, governor of Magdeburg
