= Portrait of Juliette Récamier =

Painting by François Gérard

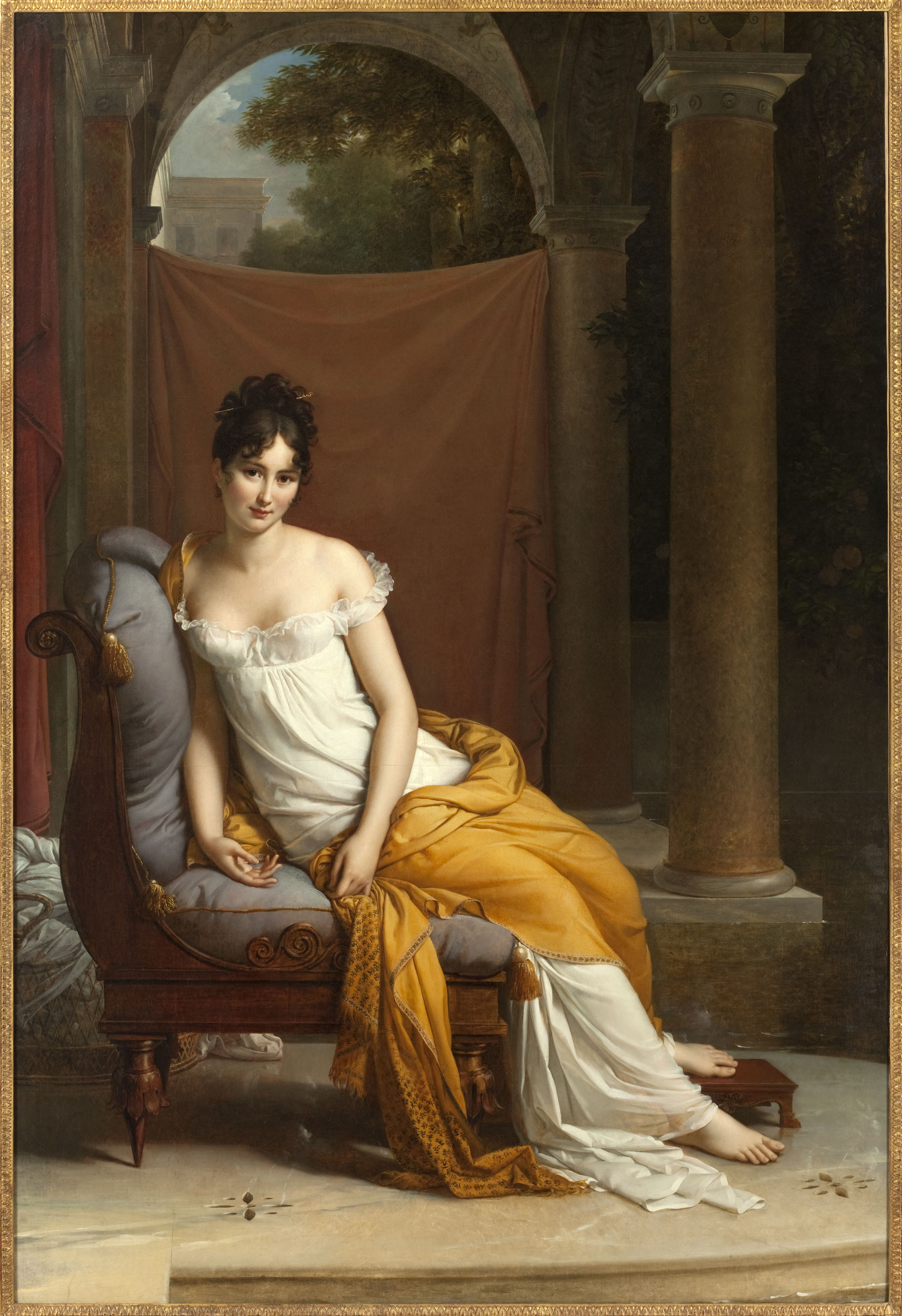
- Artist: François Gérard
- Year: 1802
- Medium: oil on canvas
- Dimensions: 225 cm × 148 cm (89 in × 58 in)
- Location: Musée Carnavalet, Paris

Portrait of Juliette Récamier is an oil-on-canvas painting by the French painter François Gérard, created in 1802. It depicts the Parisian salonier Juliette Récamier, a famous beauty of the time, in a classic pose, but with an unmistakable sensuality. The painting is held in the Musée Carnavalet, in Paris.

== History ==
Juliette Récamier (1777–1849), née Bernard, was the wife of the wealthy and much older banker Jacques Récamier (1751–1830). Since 1799 she held a popular salon in Paris for many years, which became an important meeting place for artists and intellectuals, many of whom were opponents of Napoleon. She was known for her beauty and was portrayed several times by various prominent painters.

In 1800, the neoclassical painter Jacques-Louis David painted her in a classical pose and dress, with her reclined on a type of sofa that would later be named after her: a récamier. However, she was dissatisfied with what she thought was David's cold approach, and she commissioned instead his pupil François Gérard to make a new portrait of her. When he knew of this, David decided to leave her portrait unfinished.

== Description ==
The artist portrays Récamier in a classic but equally natural environment, where the graceful curves of her figure and the nuances of her complexion blend with the shapes and colors of her surroundings. Her pose, with her body slightly contorted, her neck left uncovered by the wide neckline of her empire dress, which barely cover her breasts, and her bare feet, have an unmistakable erotic effect and seem new compared to other representations of women of the time. Here the eroticism is nuanced by the reflective facial expression of the sitter and the apparent quietness of the place, which could be a bathroom, protected from outside by a curtain. There is something thoughtful and intimate in Récamier's look, but at the same time it appears somewhat suggestive. The tension between the conflicting emotions seem to give the painting a kind of "aura".

== Provenance ==
Gérard's portrait remained in Récamier's drawing room for several years, until she gave it to her admirer, Prince Augustus of Prussia, in 1843. In 1860 it was acquired from his heirs by the Musée Carnavalet, in Paris.
