= Prince Augustus Ferdinand of Prussia =

Prussian prince (1730–1813)

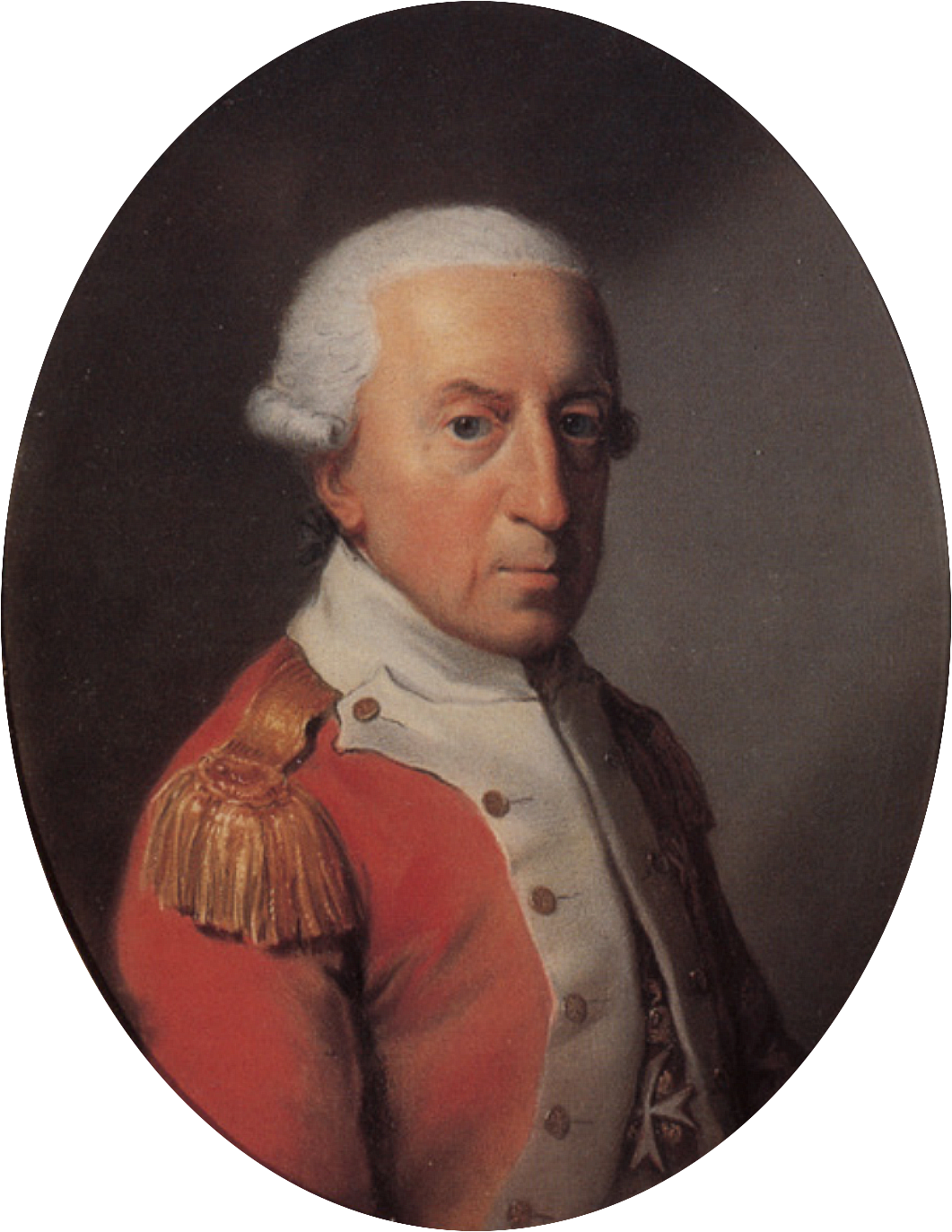
- Portrait by Johann Heinrich Schröder, c. 1790
- Born: 23 May 1730; Berlin, Kingdom of Prussia
- Died: 2 May 1813 (aged 82); Berlin, Kingdom of Prussia
- Burial: Berlin Cathedral
- Spouse: Princess Anna Elisabeth Louise of Brandenburg-Schwedt (m. 1755)
- Issue: Princess Friederike; Prince Heinrich; Louise, Princess Antoni Radziwiłł; Prince Christian; Prince Louis Ferdinand; Prince Paul; Prince Augustus
Names
- German: August Ferdinand; English: Augustus Ferdinand
- House: House of Hohenzollern
- Father: Frederick William I of Prussia
- Mother: Sophia Dorothea of Hanover

Prince Augustus Ferdinand of Prussia (German: August Ferdinand; 23 May 1730 – 2 May 1813) was a Prussian prince and general, as well as Herrenmeister ("Master of the Knights") of the Bailiwick of Brandenburg of the Order of Saint John. He belonged to the House of Hohenzollern, and was the youngest son of Frederick William I of Prussia by his wife, Queen Sophia Dorothea.

== Life ==
He was the youngest child of King Frederick William I of Prussia and his wife Sophia Dorothea of Hanover. He was also a younger brother of King Frederick the Great (Frederick II of Prussia), Queen Louisa Ulrika of Sweden, and Wilhelmine Margravine of Brandenburg-Bayreuth.

Already at the age of 5, he joined the Infantry regiment „Kronprinz“. In 1740, his brother named him commander of Infantry regiment Nr 34. In 1756, he became Major General and accompanied his brother the King on his campaigns in Saxony, Bohemia, and Silesia. He fought in the Battle of Breslau and the Battle of Leuthen. But in 1758, bad health forced him to leave the army. In 1762, he purchased Friedrichsfelde Palace near Berlin. Ferdinand is also remembered for having the Schloss Bellevue in the Berliner Tiergarten built in 1786, today seat of the Presidents of Germany.

On 12 September 1763 Ferdinand was elected as Master of the Knights of the Bailiwick of Brandenburg of the Order of Saint John, a post he held until 1812.

Augustus died in Berlin on 2 May 1813, as the last surviving grandchild of George I of Great Britain. Elisabeth Louise would die seven years later, on 10 February 1820.

== Marriage and children ==
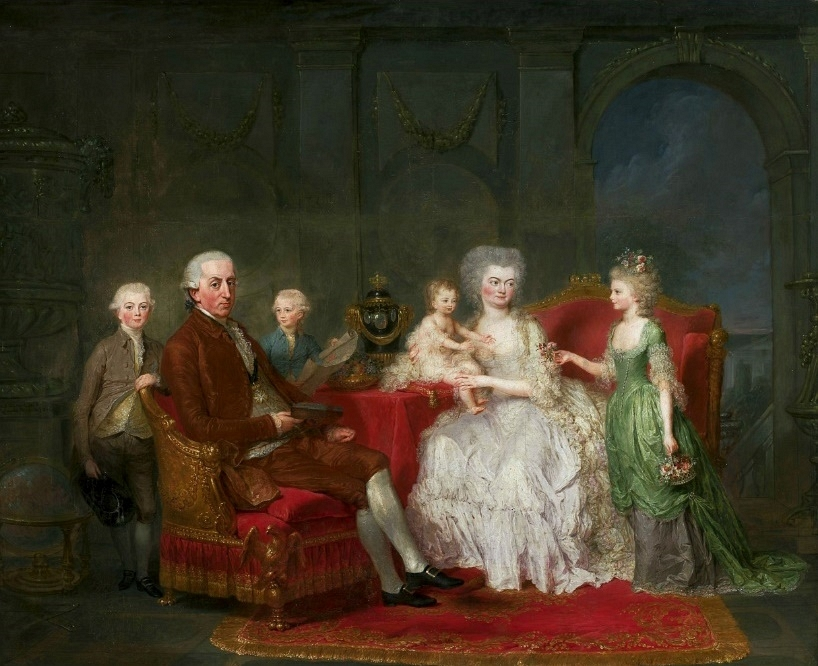
Prince Augustus Ferdinand of Prussia and family. [Marked as a painting of the family of Crown prince Frederick William of Prussia, c. 1777]

He married his niece, Margravine Elisabeth Louise of Brandenburg-Schwedt, on 27 September 1755. She was the daughter of his older sister Sophia Dorothea and Margrave Frederick William of Brandenburg-Schwedt. Despite this family tie, she was only 8 years younger than him, due to the significant age difference between him and his sister.

They had seven children:

- Princess Friederike Elisabeth Dorothea Henriette Amalie (1 November 1761 – 28 August 1773) died young aged 11.
- Prince Friedrich Heinrich Emil Karl (21 October 1769 – 8 December 1773) died in early childhood at age 4.
- Princess Friederike Louise (24 May 1770 – 7 December 1836), married to Prince Antoni Radziwiłł. Had issue.
- Prince Friedrich Christian Heinrich Ludwig (11 November 1771 – 8 October 1790) died aged 18, unmarried with no issue.
- Prince Louis Ferdinand (18 November 1772 – 10 October 1806), killed in the Battle of Saalfeld. No legitimate issue.
- Prince Friedrich Paul Heinrich August (29 November 1776 - 2 December 1776) died in infancy.
- Prince Augustus (19 September 1779 – 19 July 1843), morganatic marriage (1832-1843) to Polish aristocrat Emilie von Ostrowska.

== Gallery ==
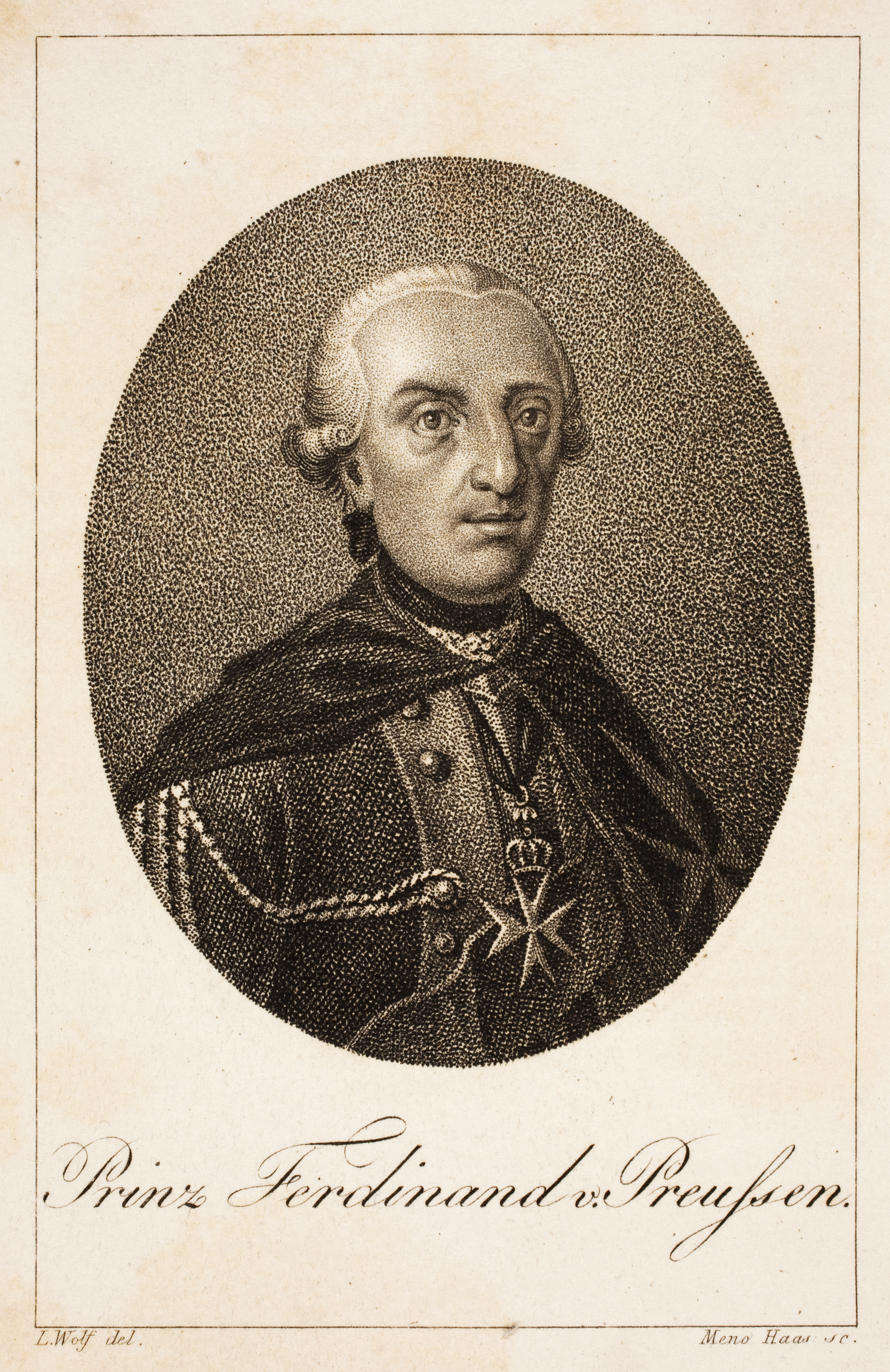
Prince Augustus Ferdinand of Prussia

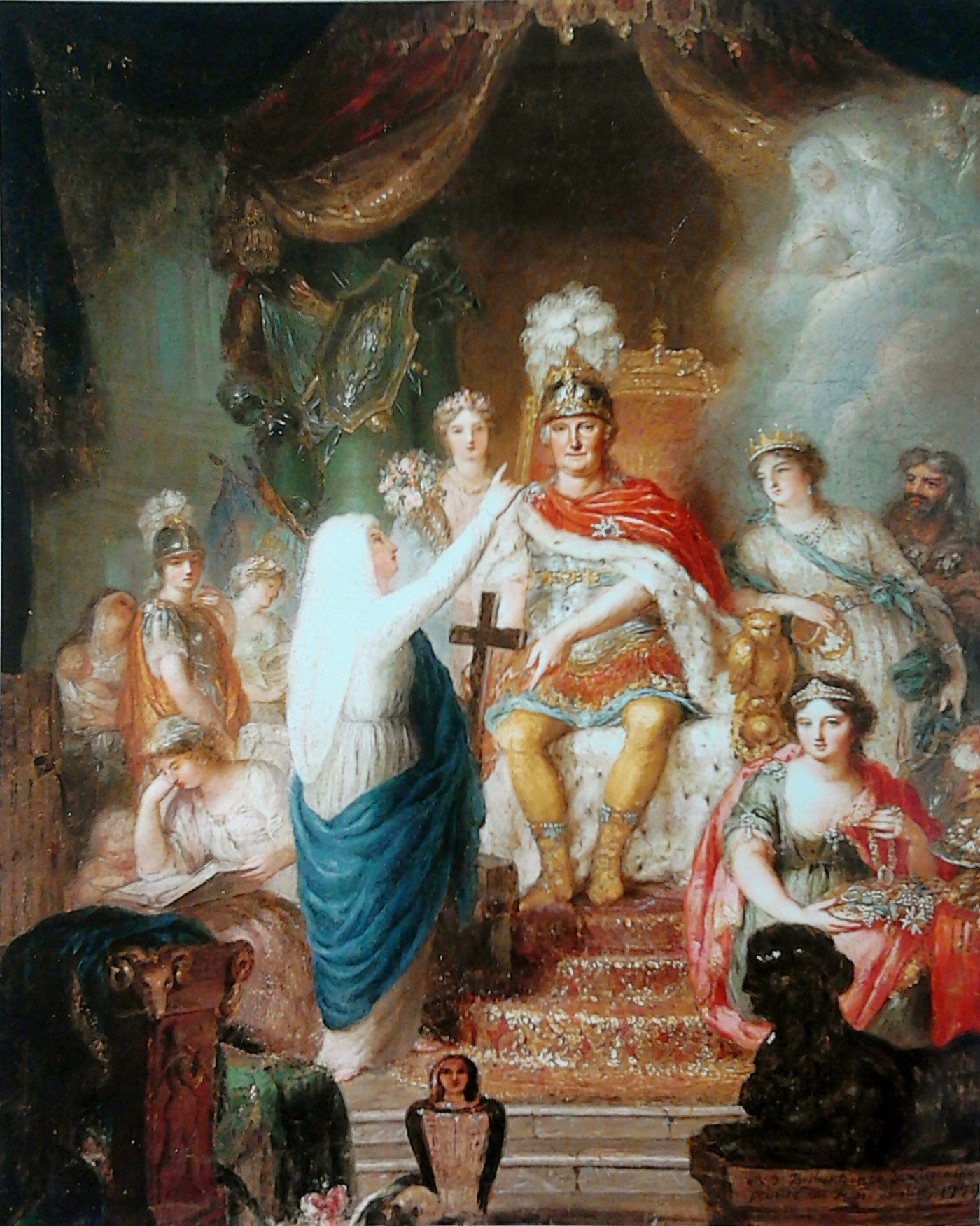
Apotheosis of Prince Augustus Ferdinand (1779) by Anna Dorothea Therbusch, Royal Castle in Warsaw

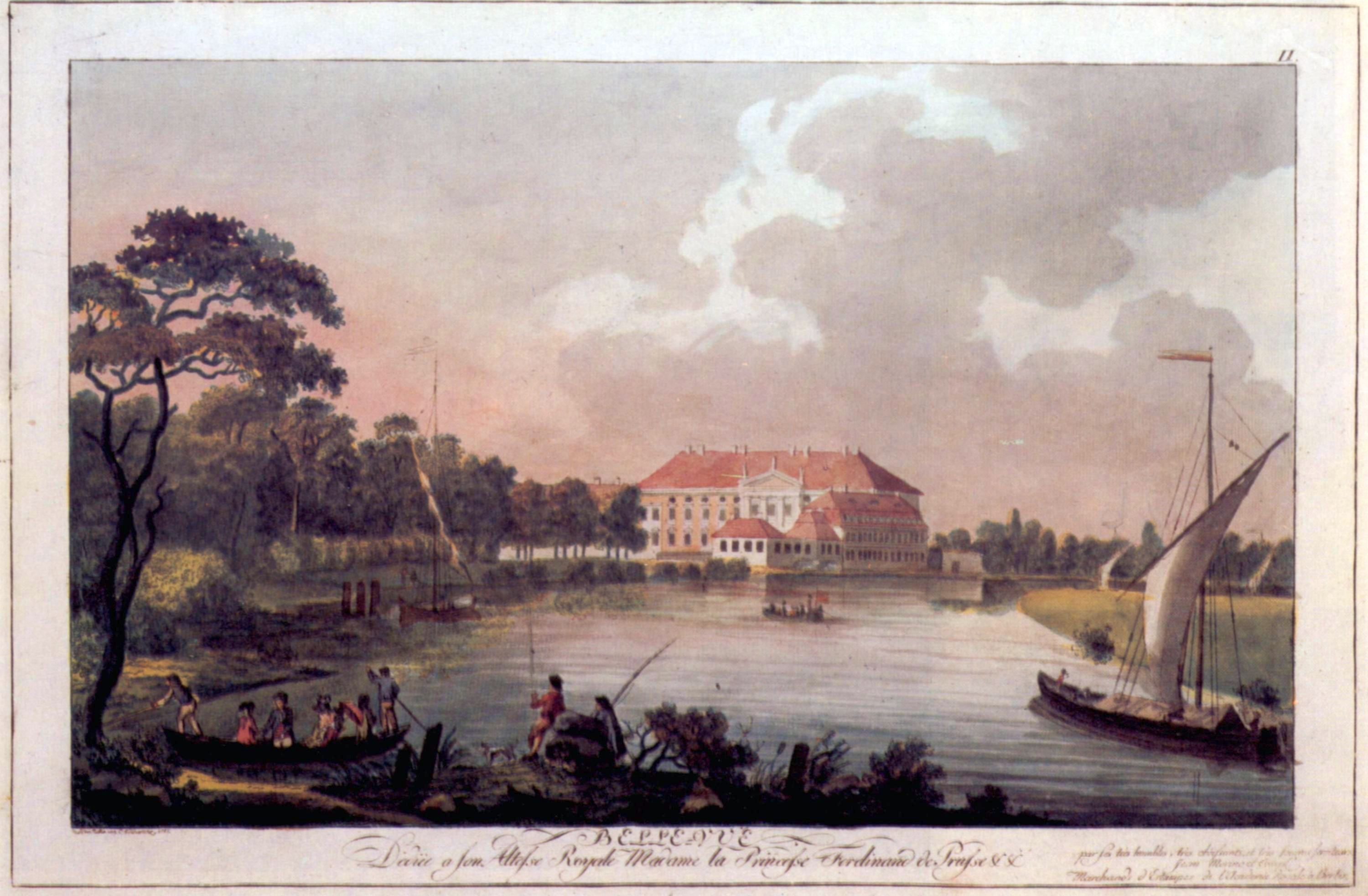
Bellevue Palace in 1797.

== Ancestry ==
Ancestors of Prince Augustus Ferdinand of Prussia

8. Frederick William, Elector of Brandenburg
4. Frederick I of Prussia
9. Louise Henriette of Orange-Nassau
2. Frederick William I of Prussia
10. Ernest Augustus, Elector of Hanover (=12)
5. Sophia Charlotte of Hanover
11. Sophia of the Palatinate (=13)
1. Prince Augustus Ferdinand of Prussia
12. Ernest Augustus, Elector of Hanover (=10)
6. George I of Great Britain
13. Sophia of the Palatinate (=11)
3. Sophia Dorothea of Hanover
14. George William, Duke of Brunswick-Lüneburg
7. Sophia Dorothea of Celle
15. Éléonore Desmier d'Olbreuse

Prince Augustus Ferdinand of Prussia House of Hohenzollern Born: 23 May 1730 Died: 2 May 1813
Preceded by Margrave Charles Frederick of Brandenburg-Schwedt	Herrenmeister (Grand Master) of the Order of Saint John; 1762–1812	Succeeded by Prince Karl of Prussia
