= Frederick William, Margrave of Brandenburg-Schwedt =

German nobleman (1700–1771)

Frederick William
- Margrave of Brandenburg-Schwedt
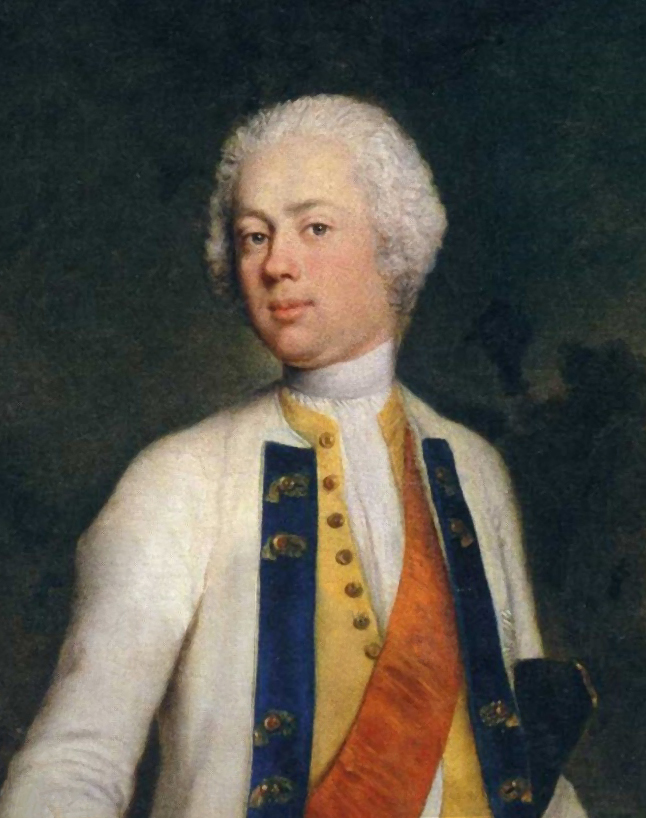
- 1734 portrait
- Born: 17 November 1700; Oranienbaum Palace, Wittenberg
- Died: 4 March 1771 (aged 70); Wildenbruch Castle
- Burial: Berlin Cathedral
- Spouse: Princess Sophia Dorothea of Prussia (m. 1734; died 1765)
- Issue: Friederike, Duchess of Württemberg; Elisabeth Louise, Princess Augustus Ferdinand of Prussia; Prince Georg Philipp; Philippine, Landgravine of Hesse-Kassel; Prince Georg Philipp Wilhelm
- House: Hohenzollern
- Father: Philip William, Margrave of Brandenburg-Schwedt
- Mother: Princess Johanna Charlotte of Anhalt-Dessau

Frederick William of Brandenburg-Schwedt (17 November 1700 – 4 March 1771) was a German nobleman. In his lifetime, from 1711 to 1771, he held the titles Prince in Prussia and Margrave of Brandenburg, with the style Royal Highness. He was made a knight of the Order of the Black Eagle.

In the 19th century he was retrospectively known by the title Margrave of Brandenburg-Schwedt, in order to differentiate his branch of the Hohenzollern dynasty. He was the second owner of the Prussian secundogeniture of Brandenburg-Schwedt. His parents were Philip William, Margrave of Brandenburg-Schwedt, and Princess Johanna Charlotte of Anhalt-Dessau. He was the nephew of King Frederick I of Prussia.

== Life ==
Frederick William was known as a brutal man because of his short temper, severity, and coarse manners. He was born at Oranienbaum Castle (modern-day Oranienbaum-Wörlitz, Wittenberg), and was educated and raised by his uncle, King Frederick I, and then by his cousin, King Frederick William I. His character closely resembled that of his second royal guardian, who like himself, hated idleness and was a terror to all loungers. The clergy were especial objects of his ridicule and persecution. His cane was as much feared as that of his royal namesake.

He made the fashionable Grand Tour, travelling to Geneva 1715, and in 1716 to Italy. He returned in 1719 to Prussia, where he received the Order of the Black Eagle from Frederick William I. On 15 June 1723 he was made a Prussian major-general. On 10 July 1737 he was appointed lieutenant-general.

The existence of the Schwedt branch of the Hohenzollern dynasty, descended as they were from Frederick I's father and being 'princes of the blood', posed a theoretical threat to the Prussian kings. Frederick William I tried to neutralise this threat by keeping his cousins close, bringing the Schwedt brothers into his own household, acting as their guardian, and later marrying Frederick William to his daughter. Following the margrave's reaching adulthood the king was so fearful of any covert political activity on his cousin's part that he sent spies to Schwedt to find out who met with Frederick William and his brother.

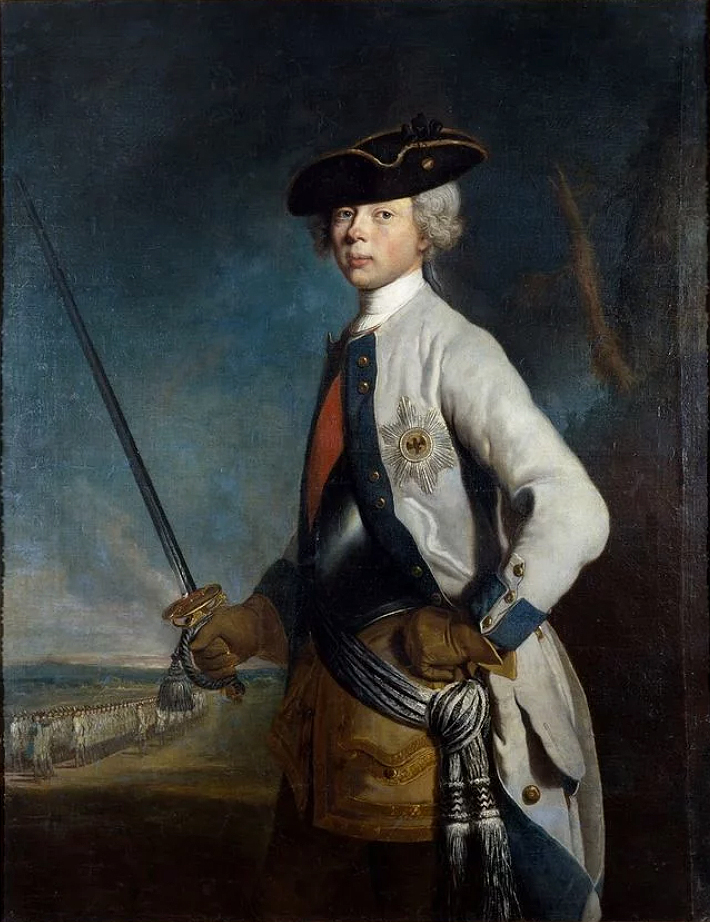
Portrait of Frederick William by Antoine Pesne

Margrave Frederick William pursued a lavish programme of building in Schwedt, both in the palace and town, and he actively purchased land and estates to augment his inheritance; this aggrandisement resulted in the king eventually forbidding him from making any more such purchases. In contrast to his father's policy Frederick II sought to distance himself from his Schwedt cousins, humiliating them at every chance. He made them unwelcome at his court, undermined the margrave's authority in his own dominions by encouraging complaints and lawsuits by his tenants and neighbours and, most effectively, he marginalised the position of the Schwedt brothers within the Prussian army. Margrave Frederick William was removed from command in the army, a denigration the king also extended to his own brothers.

Frederick William was 19 years older than his wife Sophia Dorothea of Prussia, who was his first cousin once removed. The marriage, in 1734, was at the express wish of King Frederick William, against the wishes of his daughter; the bride was given away by her brother the future Frederick II, as the king was unwell. The relationship of the couple was not happy. Sophia often fled to the protection of her brother King Frederick. The latter did not stop at friendly admonitions, but sent General Meir to Schwedt with unlimited authority to protect the margravine from insult. Eventually they lived in separate places: Sophia lived in the castle Montplaisir, and the Margrave lived in the castle of Schwedt. Apparently they were only reconciled when the margravine was in her terminal illness; she died in her husband's arms.

On 4 March 1771, Frederick William died at Wildenbruch Castle, when the heavy cold he was suffering from worsened. The Margrave acknowledged one illegitimate son, the only one of his male offspring to survive infancy. Due to his lack of surviving legitimate male issue, his lands and title were inherited by his younger brother Frederick Henry (ruled 1771–1788).

== Issue ==
In 1734, the Margrave married Sophia Dorothea of Prussia and they had five children.

- Sophia Dorothea (18 December 1736 – 9 March 1798); married Frederick II Eugene, Duke of Württemberg
- Elisabeth Louise (22 April 1738 – 10 February 1820); married her uncle Prince Augustus Ferdinand of Prussia
- George Philip (10 September 1741 – 28 April 1742) died in infancy.
- Philippine (10 October 1745 – 1 May 1800); married Frederick II, Landgrave of Hesse-Kassel (or Hesse-Cassel)
- George Frederick (3 May 1749 – 13 August 1751) died young.

He also fathered an illegitimate son named Georg Wilhelm von Jägersfeld (1725–1797).

== Genealogy ==
Frederick William belonged to a junior branch of the House of Hohenzollern; the senior branch were the Counts of Hohenzollern-Sigmaringen. The junior line produced electors of Brandenburg and kings and emperors of Prussia and Germany. Frederick William was a descendant of Burkhard I, Count of Zollern. Through his daughter Sophia Dorothea he is an ancestor of Mary of Teck, the wife of George V, and therefore an ancestor of the present British royal family.

== Ancestry ==
Ancestors of Frederick William, Margrave of Brandenburg-Schwedt

8. George William, Elector of Brandenburg
4. Frederick William I, Elector of Brandenburg
9. Elizabeth Charlotte of the Palatinate
2. Philip William, Margrave of Brandenburg-Schwedt
10. Philip, Duke of Schleswig-Holstein-Sonderburg-Glücksburg
5. Sophia Dorothea of Schleswig-Holstein-Sonderburg-Glücksburg
11. Sophia Hedwig of Saxe-Lauenburg
1. Frederick William, Margrave of Brandenburg-Schwedt
12. John Casimir, Prince of Anhalt-Dessau
6. John George II, Prince of Anhalt-Dessau
13. Agnes of Hesse-Kassel
3. Princess Johanna Charlotte of Anhalt-Dessau
14. Frederick Henry, Prince of Orange
7. Henriette Catherine of Nassau
15. Amalia of Solms-Braunfels

== See also ==
- Frederick William, the Great Elector
