= Princess Sophia Dorothea of Prussia =

Sophia Dorothea of Prussia
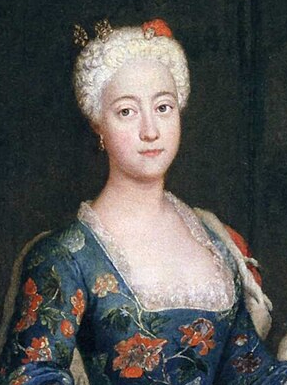
- Detail of a portrait by Antoine Pesne, c. 1734

Margravine consort of Brandenburg-Schwedt
- Tenure: 10 November 1734 – 13 November 1765
- Born: 25 January 1719; Berlin
- Died: 13 November 1765 (aged 46); Schwedt
- Burial: Berlin Cathedral
- Spouse: Frederick William, Margrave of Brandenburg-Schwedt (m. 1734)
- Issue: Sophia Dorothea, Duchess of Württemberg; Elisabeth Louise, Princess Augustus Ferdinand of Prussia; Prince Georg Philipp; Philippine, Landgravine of Hesse-Kassel; Prince Georg Philipp Wilhelm
Names
- German: Sophie Dorothea Marie
- House: Hohenzollern
- Father: Frederick William I of Prussia
- Mother: Sophia Dorothea of Hanover

Princess Sophia Dorothea of Prussia (German: Sophie Dorothea Marie von Preußen; 25 January 1719 – 13 November 1765) was the ninth child and fifth daughter of Frederick William I of Prussia and Sophia Dorothea of Hanover. By marriage, she was a Margravine of Brandenburg-Schwedt.

== Biography ==
=== Marriage and children ===
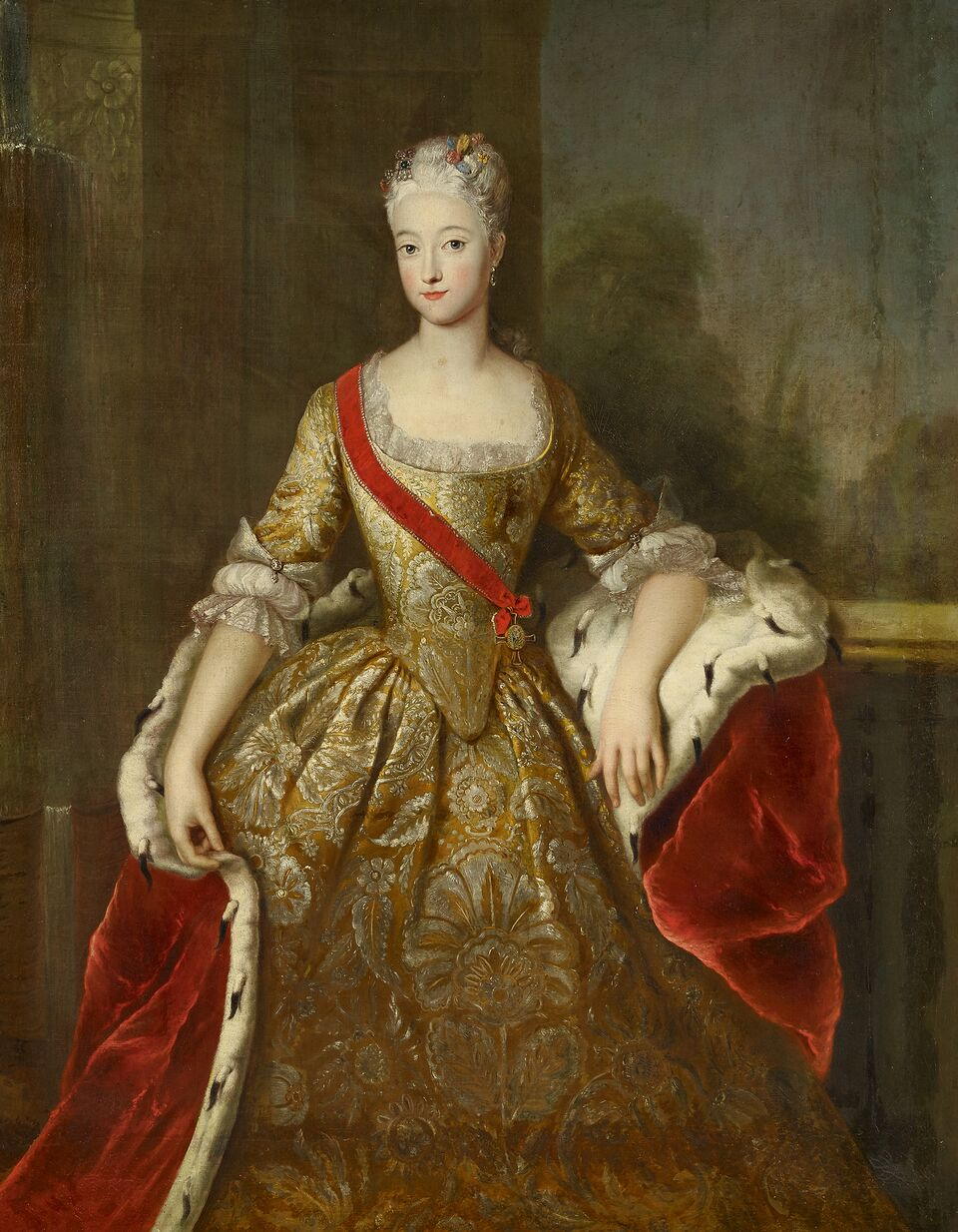
Childhood portrait of Sophia Dorothea by Antoine Pesne, c. 1731

On 10 November 1734 in Potsdam, Sophia Dorothea married her Hohenzollern kinsman Frederick William, Margrave of Brandenburg-Schwedt, son of Philip William, Margrave of Brandenburg-Schwedt, and Princess Johanna Charlotte of Anhalt-Dessau, daughter of John George II, Prince of Anhalt-Dessau. They had five children:

- Princess Friederike of Brandenburg-Schwedt (18 December 1736 – 9 March 1798); married Frederick II Eugene, Duke of Württemberg.
- Princess Anna Elisabeth Louise of Brandenburg-Schwedt (22 April 1738 – 10 February 1820); married her uncle Prince Augustus Ferdinand of Prussia.
- Prince Georg Philipp of Brandenburg-Schwedt (10 September 1741 – 28 April 1742)
- Princess Philippine of Brandenburg-Schwedt (10 October 1745 – 1 May 1800); married Frederick II, Landgrave of Hesse-Kassel.
- Prince Georg Philipp Wilhelm of Brandenburg-Schwedt (3 May 1749 – 13 August 1751)

Frederick William was 19 years older than the princess and he was called the "mad Margrave" because of his pranks and rude manners. Their relationship was not happy, and eventually they lived in separate places: Sophie lived in the castle Montplaisir near the residence, and the Margrave lived in the castle of Schwedt. They only reconciled during Sophie's terminal illness, when she died in the Margrave's arms. She did not, reportedly, have the same spiritual interests of her siblings, Frederick the Great, King of Prussia and Louisa Ulrika, Queen of Sweden. The Margraviate of Schwedt was only a small holding, but enjoyed a prosperous economy due to immigrant Huguenots.

== Ancestry ==
Ancestors of Princess Sophia Dorothea of Prussia

8. Frederick William, Elector of Brandenburg
4. Frederick I of Prussia
9. Louise Henriette of Orange-Nassau
2. Frederick William I of Prussia
10. Ernest Augustus, Elector of Hanover
5. Sophia Charlotte of Hanover
11. Sophia of the Palatinate
1. Princess Sophia Dorothea of Prussia
12. Ernest Augustus, Elector of Hanover
6. George I of Great Britain
13. Sophia of the Palatinate
3. Sophia Dorothea of Hanover
14. George William, Duke of Brunswick-Lüneburg
7. Sophia Dorothea of Celle
15. Éléonore Desmier d'Olbreuse

Princess Sophia Dorothea of Prussia House of Hohenzollern Born: 25 January 1719 Died: 10 November 1765
German nobility
Vacant Title last held by Johanna Charlotte of Anhalt-Dessau	Margravine of Brandenburg-Schwedt; 10 November 1734 – 13 November 1765	Vacant Title next held by Leopoldine Marie of Anhalt-Dessau
