= Princess Johanna Charlotte of Anhalt-Dessau =

Princess of Anhalt-Dessau and Margravine (1682–1750)

Princess Johanna Charlotte
- Born: 6 April 1682; Dessau
- Died: 31 March 1750 (aged 67); Herford
- Spouse: Philip William, Margrave of Brandenburg-Schwedt (m. 1699; died 1711)
- Issue: Frederick William, Margrave of Brandenburg-Schwedt; Friederike Dorothea; Henrietta, Hereditary Princess of Württemberg; George William; Frederick Henry, Margrave of Brandenburg-Schwedt; Charlotte
- House: Ascania
- Father: John George II, Prince of Anhalt-Dessau
- Mother: Henriette Catherine of Nassau

Johanna Charlotte of Anhalt-Dessau (6 April 1682 – 31 March 1750) was a princess of Anhalt-Dessau from the House of Ascania by birth and Margravine of Brandenburg-Schwedt by marriage. From 1729 until her death she was abbess of Herford Abbey.

== Life ==
Johanna Charlotte was the youngest daughter of John George II, Prince of Anhalt-Dessau, from his marriage to Henriette Catherine of Nassau, daughter of Prince Frederick Henry of Orange. The princess was able to take advantage of a careful and comprehensive education.

On 25 January 1699 she married Philip William, Margrave of Brandenburg-Schwedt (1669–1711), in Oranienbaum. Although the couple had their own palace in Berlin, they lived mostly in Schwedt. After the death of her husband, Johanna Charlotte went back to Berlin and looked after the education of her children.

In 1729, she had herself elected abbess of Herford Abbey, which was under Prussian protection. She was sworn in as the new abbess on 10 October 1729, but lived at first in Buchholz, Schaumburg. It was not until 1735 that she took up permanent residence in Herford. Later in 1729, she added a secular order to her abbey and accepted 17 canonesses. She appointed Hedwig Sophie of Schleswig-Holstein-Gottorp as her coadjutor. Hedwig Sophie later became her successor.

Johanna Charlotte died of an "apoplexy", without being ill, in the night of 30 to 31 March 1750. She was buried in the crypt of the Collegiate Chapel of Herford, which had just been renovated.

== Issue ==
From their marriage, Charlotte Johanna had the following children:

- Frederick William (1700–1771), Margrave of Brandenburg-Schwedt

married in 1734 princess Sophie of Prussia (1719–1765)

- Friederike Dorothea Henriette (1700–1701)
- Henriette Marie (1702–1782)

married in 1716 Prince Frederick Louis of Württemberg (1698–1731)

- George William (1704–1704)
- Frederick Henry (1709–1788), Margrave of Brandenburg-Schwedt

married in 1739 princess Leopoldine Marie of Anhalt-Dessau (1716–1782)

- Charlotte (1710–1712)
