= Countess Henriette Catharina of Nassau =

Princess consort of Anhalt-Dessau (1637–1708)

Henriette Catherine of Nassau
- Princess consort of Anhalt-Dessau
- Born: 10 February 1637; The Hague
- Died: 3 November 1708 (aged 71)
- Spouse: John George II, Prince of Anhalt-Dessau (m. 1659; died 1693)
- Issue: Amalie Ludovika; Henriette Amalie; Frederick Casimir, Hereditary Prince of Anhalt-Dessau; Elisabeth Albertine, Abbess of Herford, then Countess of Barby; Henriette Amalie, Princess of Nassau-Dietz; Louise Sophie; Marie Eleonore, Duchess of Olyka; Henriette Agnes; Leopold I, Prince of Anhalt-Dessau; Johanna Charlotte, Margravine of Brandenburg-Schwedt, then Abbess of Herford
- House: Orange-Nassau
- Father: Frederick Henry, Prince of Orange
- Mother: Amalia of Solms-Braunfels

Henriette Catherine of Nassau (Dutch: Henriëtte Catharina, German: Henriette Katharina; 10 February 1637 – 3 November 1708) was princess consort of Anhalt-Dessau by marriage to John George II, Prince of Anhalt-Dessau, and regent of Anhalt-Dessau from 1693 to 1698 during the minority (and then the absence) of her son Leopold I, Prince of Anhalt-Dessau.

== Life ==
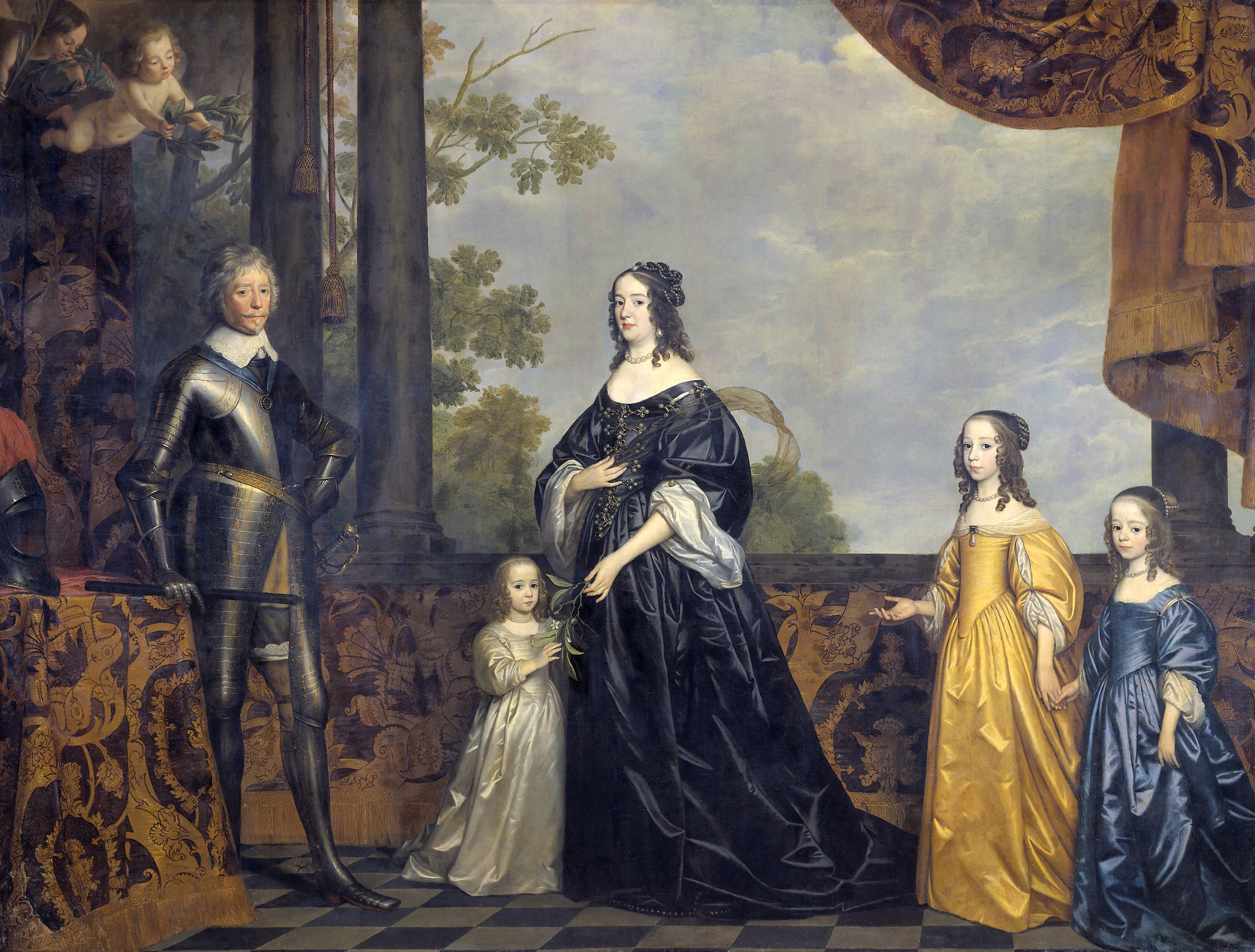
Frederick Henry, Amalia and their youngest three daughters, Henriette is first on the right

Henriette was born in The Hague as a member of the House of Orange-Nassau, being the seventh of nine children born to Frederick Henry, Prince of Orange and Amalia of Solms-Braunfels. Some of her siblings died in childhood. Henriette and four other siblings lived to adulthood, her surviving siblings were: William II, Prince of Orange, Luise Henriette of Nassau, Albertine Agnes of Nassau and Maria of Nassau.

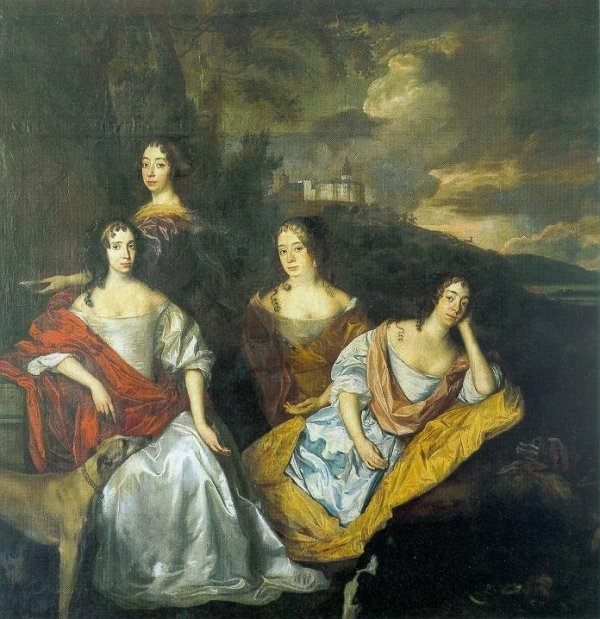
Henriette and her sisters

=== Princess consort of Anhalt-Dessau ===
The Thirty Years War had left Germany in ruins but the Netherlands under the reign of Henriette's father, Frederick Henry, had made great progress since the assassination of William the Silent. Her father wanted to make peace with Germany and so married some of his daughters off to German nobles.

Her mother, continuing this policy had Henriette married to John George II, Prince of Anhalt-Dessau in Groningen on 9 September 1659. Henriette's consent cannot have been taken for granted: she was a woman of spirit and independence, who had already refused to marry a cousin whom she disliked, and for a time considered marrying her brother-in-law Charles II of England. Judging by his letters Charles may have been genuinely in love with her, but later said that he was happy about her marriage, and believed that Henriette and John had married for love.

Henriette and John George were a great influence over the German court at agriculture, construction of ports, levees, architecture and painting. In 1660, John George gave his wife the town of Nischwitz where she built houses and a cemetery, made glass and brought it to fruition.

=== Regency ===
John George died in Berlin 1693. Their son, Leopold was still only a minor, so Henriette resumed regency for his son until he came of age, and resigned from regency in 1698. She was first regent during his minority; when he became of age, however, she continued as regent due to his absence from the Principality, and thus did not resign her regency until 1698.

During her regency, she founded a refuge home for children and women and instituted regulations for lawyers and a system for the care of orphans.

Henriette died in 1708.

== Issue ==
1. Amalie Ludovika (Berlin, 7 September 1660 - Dessau, 12 November 1660).
2. Henriette Amalie (Cölln an der Spree, 4 January 1662 - Cölln an der Spree, 28 January 1662).
3. Frederick Casimir, Hereditary Prince of Anhalt-Dessau (Cölln an der Spree, 8 November 1663 - Cölln an der Spree, 27 May 1665).
4. Elisabeth Albertine (Cölln an der Spree, 1 May 1665 - Dessau, 5 October 1706), Abbess of Herford (1680–1686); married on 30 March 1686 to Henry of Saxe-Weissenfels, Count of Barby.
5. Henriette Amalie (Kleve, 26 August 1666 - Oranienstein an der Lahn, 18 April 1726), married on 26 November 1683 to Henry Casimir II, Prince of Nassau-Dietz.
6. Louise Sophie (Dessau, 15 September 1667 - Dessau, 18 April 1678).
7. Marie Eleonore (Dessau, 14 March 1671 - Dessau, 18 May 1756), married on 3 September 1687 to Prince Jerzy Radziwiłł, Duke of Olyka.
8. Henriette Agnes (Dessau, 9 September 1674 - Dessau, 18 January 1729).
9. Leopold I, Prince of Anhalt-Dessau (Dessau, 3 July 1676 - Dessau, 9 April 1747).
10. Johanna Charlotte (Dessau, 6 April 1682 - Herford, 31 March 1750), Abbess of Herford (1729–1750); married on 25 January 1699 to Philip William, Margrave of Brandenburg-Schwedt.

== Legacy ==
It is speculated that Princess Catharina-Amalia of the Netherlands, daughter of Willem-Alexander of the Netherlands and current heir apparent to the dutch throne, was named Catharina after Henriette Catherine.

== Ancestors ==
Henriette Catherine's ancestors in three generations
Henriette Catherine of Nassau	Father: Frederik Hendrik of Orange	Paternal Grandfather: William the Silent	Paternal Great-grandfather: William I, Count of Nassau-Siegen
Henriette Catherine of Nassau	Father: Frederik Hendrik of Orange	Paternal Grandfather: William the Silent	Paternal Great-grandmother: Juliana of Stolberg
Henriette Catherine of Nassau	Father: Frederik Hendrik of Orange	Paternal Grandmother: Louise de Coligny	Paternal Great-grandfather: Gaspard de Coligny
Henriette Catherine of Nassau	Father: Frederik Hendrik of Orange	Paternal Grandmother: Louise de Coligny	Paternal Great-grandmother: Charlotte de Laval
Henriette Catherine of Nassau	Mother: Amalia of Solms-Braunfels	Maternal Grandfather: John Albert I, Count of Solms-Braunfels	Maternal Great-grandfather: Conrad, Count of Solms-Braunfels
Henriette Catherine of Nassau	Mother: Amalia of Solms-Braunfels	Maternal Grandfather: John Albert I, Count of Solms-Braunfels	Maternal Great-grandmother: Elisabeth of Nassau-Dillenburg
Henriette Catherine of Nassau	Mother: Amalia of Solms-Braunfels	Maternal Grandmother: Agnes of Sayn-Wittgenstein	Maternal Great-grandfather: Louis I, Count of Sayn-Wittgenstein
Henriette Catherine of Nassau	Mother: Amalia of Solms-Braunfels	Maternal Grandmother: Agnes of Sayn-Wittgenstein	Maternal Great-grandmother: Elisabeth of Solms-Laubach
