= John George II of Anhalt-Dessau =

Prince of Anhalt-Dessau (1627–1693)

John George II
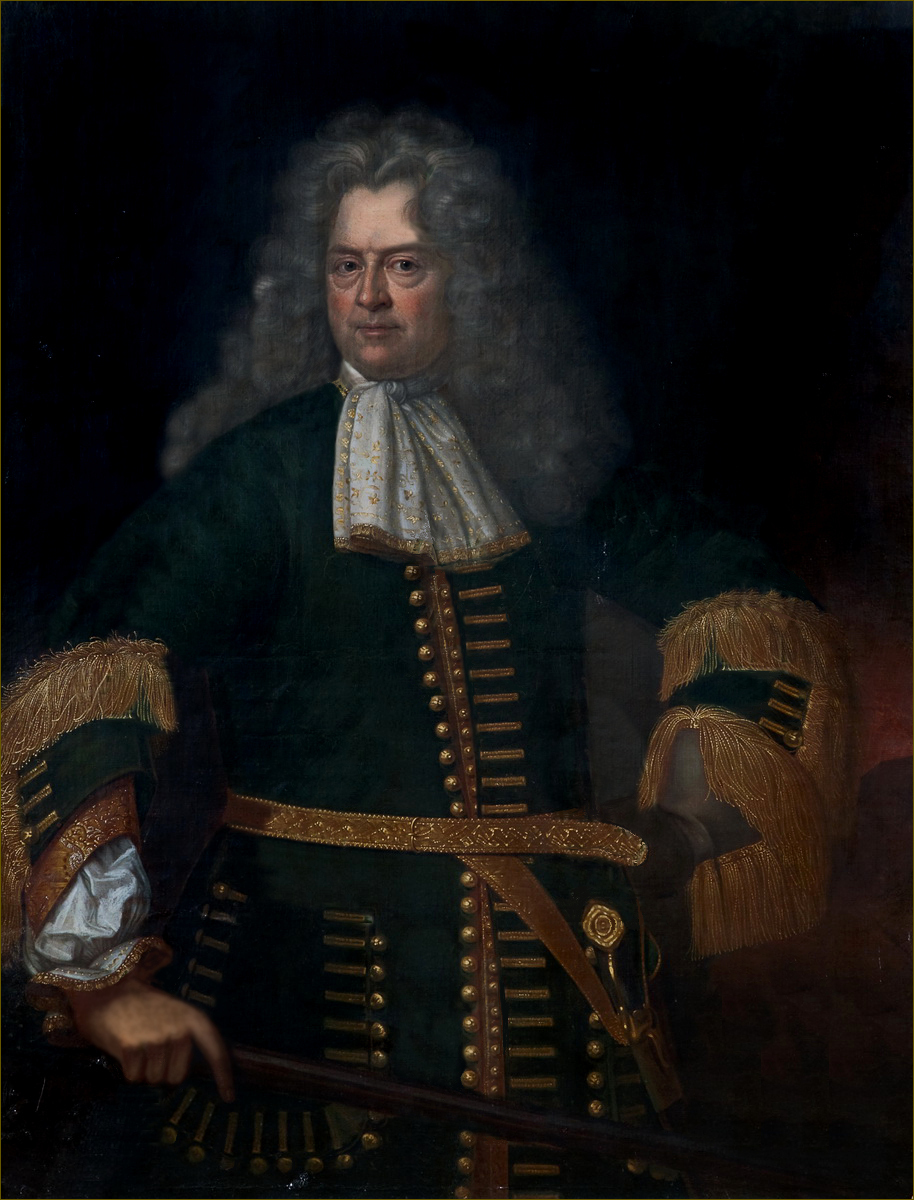

Prince of Anhalt-Dessau
- Reign: 1660–1693
- Predecessor: John Casimir
- Successor: Leopold I
- Born: 17 November 1627; Dessau, Principality of Anhalt-Dessau
- Died: 7 August 1693 (aged 65); Berlin
- Spouse: Henriette Catherine of Nassau (m. 1659)
- Issue: Amalie Ludovika; Henriette Amalie; Frederick Casimir, Hereditary Prince of Anhalt-Dessau; Elisabeth Albertine, Abbess of Herford, then Countess of Barby; Henriette Amalie, Princess of Nassau-Dietz; Louise Sophie; Marie Eleonore, Duchess of Olyka; Henriette Agnes; Leopold I, Prince of Anhalt-Dessau; Johanna Charlotte, Margravine of Brandenburg-Schwedt, then Abbess of Herford
- House: Ascania
- Father: John Casimir, Prince of Anhalt-Dessau
- Mother: Agnes of Hesse-Kassel

John George II (17 November 1627 – 7 August 1693) was a German prince of the House of Ascania and ruler of the principality of Anhalt-Dessau from 1660 to 1693.

A member of the Fruitbearing Society, he also served as a field marshal of Brandenburg-Prussia.

== Life ==
=== Early life ===
John George was born on 17 November 1627 at Dessau, the second (but eldest and only surviving) son of John Casimir, Prince of Anhalt-Dessau, by his first wife Agnes, daughter of Maurice, Landgrave of Hesse-Kassel.
Johan Georg entered Swedish service in 1655 as a cavalry colonel and participated in the wars in Poland and Denmark.

=== Marriage ===
In Groningen on 9 September 1659 John George married Henriette Katharina (b. The Hague, 10 February 1637 – d. Schloss Oranienbaum, 3 November 1708), daughter of Frederick Henry, Prince of Orange. The marriage was happy and was even said by some to be a love match. They had ten children.

=== Reign ===
After the death of his father on 15 July 1660, John George took over the government of Anhalt-Dessau. He also inherited his family's claim on Aschersleben, which had been controlled by Brandenburg-Prussia since 1648.

John George made his military career in the service of the Prussian army; the Elector Frederick William named him a Generalfeldmarschall in 1670. After France invaded Frederick William's Duchy of Cleves, John George negotiated a treaty in Vienna in June 1672 between Leopold I, Holy Roman Emperor, and Frederick William, by which each pledged to provide 12,000 troops to uphold the borders of the Peace of Westphalia in the face of French aggression. John George was chosen to lead the largely unsuccessful campaign, which led Georg von Derfflinger to temporarily resign in protest.

While campaigning against the French for control of Alsace in 1674, most of Frederick William's army went into winter quarters in Franconian Schweinfurt. As viceroy (Statthalter), John George commanded the troops remaining in Brandenburg. King Louis XIV of France convinced King Charles XI of Sweden to invade Brandenburg; after dispersing John George's small force, the Swedish troops went into winter quarters as well. The Prince of Dessau took part in Frederick William's retaliatory campaign in 1675, which resulted in the Battle of Fehrbellin.

In 1683 John George travelled to Passau, ostensibly to discuss Brandenburg's involvement in the Ottoman wars with the emperor Leopold, although his main aim was to advise against another French war. The prince reaffirmed Brandenburg's alliance with Austria.

=== Death and succession ===
Prince John George died in Berlin on 7 August 1693. He was succeeded as prince of Anhalt-Dessau by his eldest surviving son, Leopold.

== Issue ==
Name	Birth	Death	Notes
By Henriette Catherine of Nassau
Amalie Ludovika	Berlin, 7 September 1660	Dessau, 12 November 1660
Henriette Amalie	Cölln an der Spree, 4 January 1662	Cölln an der Spree, 28 January 1662
Frederick Casimir, Hereditary Prince of Anhalt-Dessau	Cölln an der Spree, 8 November 1663	Cölln an der Spree, 27 May 1665
Elisabeth Albertine	Cölln an der Spree, 1 May 1665	Dessau, 5 October 1706	Abbess of Herford 1680–1686; married on 30 March 1686 to Henry of Saxe-Weissenfels, Count of Barby
Henriette Amalie	Kleve, 26 August 1666	Oranienstein Castle, Diez an der Lahn, 18 April 1726	married on 26 November 1683 to Henry Casimir II, Prince of Nassau-Dietz
Louise Sophie	Dessau, 15 September 1667	Dessau, 18 April 1678
Marie Eleonore	Dessau, 14 March 1671	Dessau, 18 May 1756	married on 3 September 1687 to Prince Jerzy Radziwiłł, Duke of Olyka.
Henriette Agnes	Dessau, 9 September 1674	Dessau, 18 January 1729	Unmarried.
Leopold I, Prince of Anhalt-Dessau	Dessau, 3 July 1676	Dessau, 9 April 1747
Johanna Charlotte	Dessau, 6 April 1682	Herford, 31 March 1750	Abbess of Herford 1729–1750; married on 25 January 1699 to Philip William, Margrave of Brandenburg-Schwedt.

John George II of Anhalt-Dessau House of Ascania Born: 17 November 1627 Died: 7 August 1693
Preceded by John Casimir	Prince of Anhalt-Dessau; 1660–1693	Succeeded by Leopold I
