= Philip William, Margrave of Brandenburg-Schwedt =

Prussian prince (1669–1711)

Philip William
- Margrave of Brandenburg-Schwedt
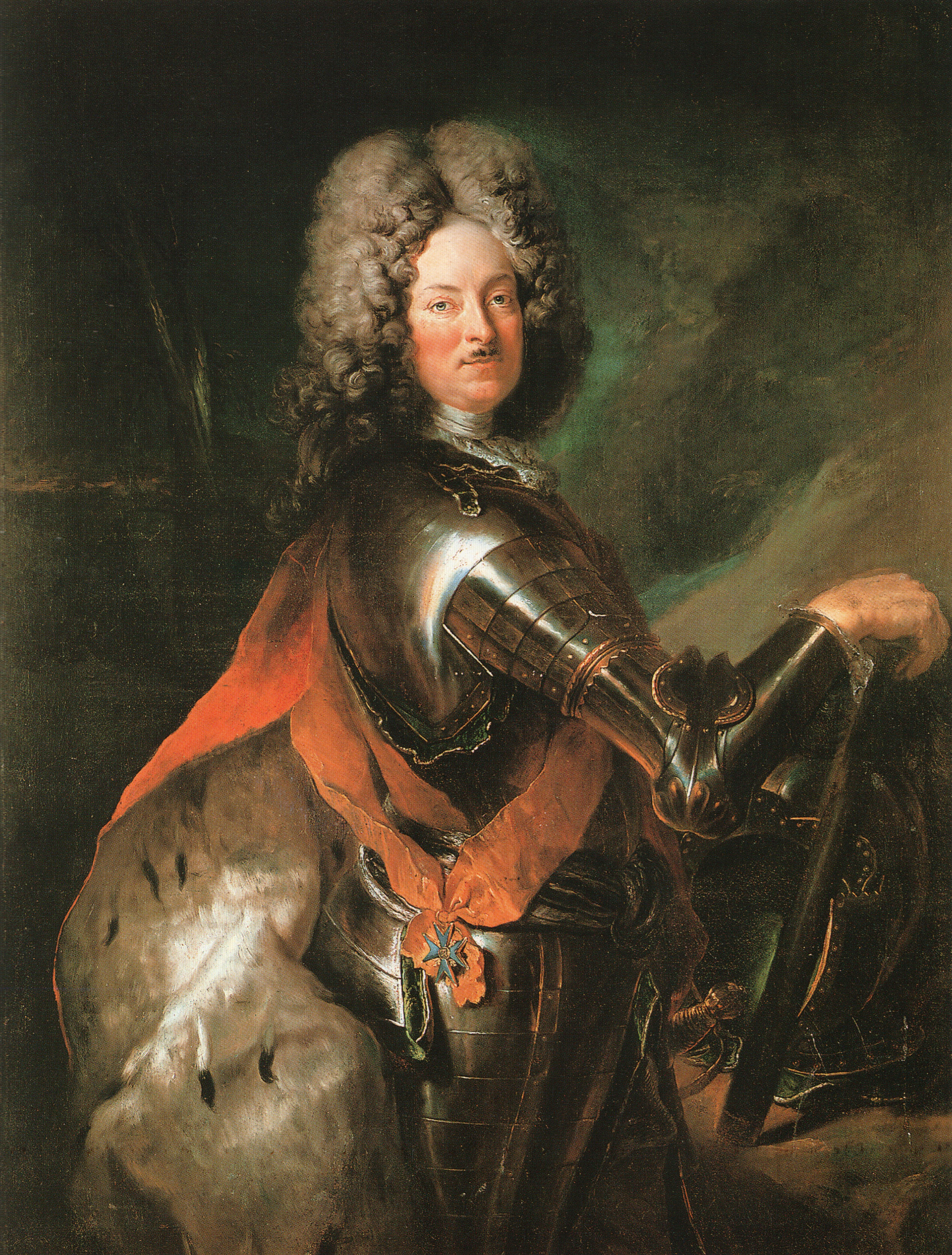
- Portrait by Antoine Pesne
- Born: 19 May 1669 castle of Königsberg
- Died: 19 December 1711 (aged 42) castle of Schwedt
- Spouse: Princess Johanna Charlotte of Anhalt-Dessau (m. 1699)
- Issue: Frederick William, Margrave of Brandenburg-Schwedt; Friederike Dorothea; Henrietta, Hereditary Princess of Württemberg; George William; Frederick Henry, Margrave of Brandenburg-Schwedt; Charlotte
- House: Hohenzollern
- Father: Frederick William I, Elector of Brandenburg
- Mother: Sophia Dorothea of Schleswig-Holstein-Sonderburg-Glücksburg

Philip William, Prince in Prussia (German: Philipp Wilhelm von Brandenburg-Schwedt; 19 May 1669, castle of Königsberg – 19 December 1711, castle of Schwedt) was a Prussian Prince, was the first owner of the Prussian secundogeniture of Brandenburg-Schwedt and was governor of Magdeburg from 1692 to 1711.

== Biography ==
Philip William was the eldest son of the Great Elector and his second wife, Princess Sophia Dorothea of Schleswig-Holstein-Sonderburg-Glücksburg. One of her major endeavours was to ensure the financial security of her sons, mostly by the purchase of land. Shortly after the birth of Philip William, he was invested with his mother's dominion of Schwedt, later, the Brandenburg-Prussian government added the lands of Wildenbruch. Both dominions were improved by Princess Dorothea's care and investments. Following the death of his mother, Philip, in an accord of dating to 3 March 1692, reached agreement with his half-brother, the Elector Friedrich III, about income and lands left to him by the Great Elector, including the lordship, without sovereignty, of Halberstadt. Philip received for himself and his descendants guaranteed appanages generating an income of 24,000 thalers each year. Added revenue came in to the amount of 22,000 thalers from the rule of Schwedt, plus military salaries of about 20,000 thalers, so that with a total income of 66,000 crowns he was enabled to hold court, in some style, himself.

He held, like all the male members of his house, the courtesy title, Margrave of Brandenburg. After the coronation of his elder brother, Frederick, he became Prince in Prussia, Margrave of Brandenburg with the style Royal Highness. The nomenclature "Brandenburg-Schwedt" came into use in the 19th century, posthumously, to distinguish the lords of Schwedt from the main line of the Hohenzollerns. Philip William was the ancestor of the Schwedt branch of the Royal House of Hohenzollern. On 25 January 1699 Philip Wilhelm married Princess Johanna Charlotte of Anhalt-Dessau (1682–1750), daughter of John George II, Prince of Anhalt-Dessau. As a widow she became Abbess of the Imperial Abbey of Herford.

Philipp Wilhelm served as a general in the campaigns against France and was promoted in 1697 to Inspector-General of the artillery. His half-brother, Prince Elector Friedrich III (later King Frederick I of Prussia), also gave him the proprietorship of several regiments. During his time as governor of Magdeburg, he was raised by the University of Halle (Saale) to the post of "Rector magnificentissimus”.

Philip's Berlin residence, the Margrave Weilersche Palace, was later used by Kaiser Wilhelm I. He was buried in the Berlin Cathedral, where most of the senior members of the House of Hohenzollern are buried.

Since Philip's eldest son, Frederick William, was a minor at his death, the King of Prussia (Frederick I and Frederick William I) took over guardianship. With the death of his granddaughter, Anna Elisabeth Luise, the collateral line of Brandenburg-Schwedt became extinct in 1820.

== Issue ==
- Frederick William, Margrave of Brandenburg-Schwedt (1700–1771); married in 1734 Princess Sophia Dorothea of Prussia (1719–1765).
- Margravine Friederike Dorothea Henriette of Brandenburg-Schwedt (24 February 1700 – 7 February 1701) died in infancy.
- Margravine Henrietta Maria of Brandenburg-Schwedt (1702–1782); married in 1716 Hereditary Prince Frederick Louis of Württemberg (1698–1731).
- George William of Brandenburg-Schwedt (10 May 1704 - 26 March 1704) died in infancy.
- Frederick Henry, Margrave of Brandenburg-Schwedt (1709–1788); married in 1739 Princess Leopoldine Marie of Anhalt-Dessau (1716–1782).
- Margravine Charlotte of Brandenburg-Schwedt (1 May 1710 – 4 May 1712) died young.

== Ancestry ==
Ancestors of Philip William, Margrave of Brandenburg-Schwedt

8. John Sigismund, Elector of Brandenburg
4. George William, Elector of Brandenburg
9. Duchess Anna of Prussia
2. Frederick William I, Elector of Brandenburg
10. Frederick IV, Elector Palatine
5. Elizabeth Charlotte of the Palatinate
11. Countess Louise Juliana of Nassau
1. Philip William, Margrave of Brandenburg-Schwedt
12. John II, Duke of Schleswig-Holstein-Sonderburg
6. Philip, Duke of Schleswig-Holstein-Sonderburg-Glücksburg
13. Elisabeth of Brunswick-Grubenhagen
3. Sophia Dorothea of Schleswig-Holstein-Sonderburg-Glücksburg
14. Francis II, Duke of Saxe-Lauenburg
7. Sophia Hedwig of Saxe-Lauenburg
15. Maria of Brunswick-Lüneburg
