= Auguste of Anhalt-Dessau =

- Auguste in 1820

Princess of Schwarzburg-Rudolstadt
- Tenure: 15 April 1816 – 12 June 1854
- Born: 18 August 1793; Dessau, Anhalt, Holy Roman Empire
- Died: 12 June 1854 (aged 60); Rudolstadt, Schwarzburg-Rudolstadt
- Burial: Rudolstadt
- Spouse: Frederick Günther, Prince of Schwarzburg-Rudolstadt (m. 1816)
- Issue: Prince Frederick Günther; Prince Günther; Prince Gustav
Names
- German: Amalie Auguste
- House: Ascania
- Father: Frederick, Hereditary Prince of Anhalt-Dessau
- Mother: Amalie of Hesse-Homburg

Princess Amalie Auguste of Anhalt-Dessau (German: Prinzessin Amalie Auguste von Anhalt-Dessau; 18 August 1793 – 12 June 1854) was a German princess of Anhalt-Dessau who was Princess consort of Schwarzburg-Rudolstadt from 1816 to 1854 as the wife of Friedrich Günther, Prince of Schwarzburg-Rudolstadt.

== Early life ==
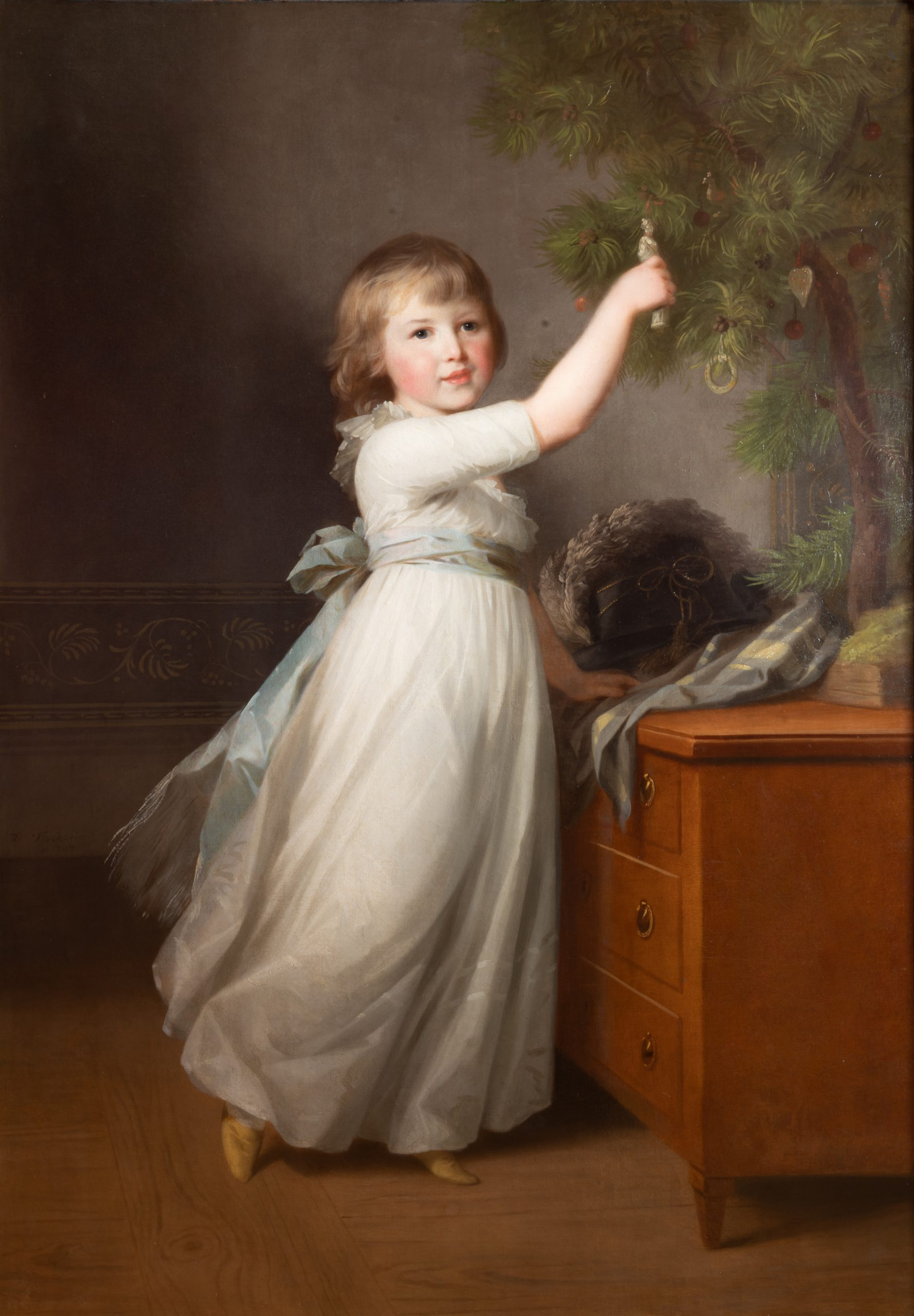
Portrait of Auguste as a child by Johann Friedrich August Tischbein, 1797

Auguste was born on 18 August 1793 in Dessau as the eldest child of Frederick, Hereditary Prince of Anhalt-Dessau, and his wife, Landgravine Amalie of Hesse-Homburg (daughter of Frederick V, Landgrave of Hesse-Homburg).

== Marriage and issue ==
On 15 April 1816 she was married in Dessau to her first cousin, Frederick Günther, reigning Prince of Schwarzburg-Rudolstadt (son of Louis Frederick II, Prince of Schwarzburg-Rudolstadt, and his wife, Landgravine Caroline of Hesse-Homburg). They had three sons:

- Prince Friedrich Günther of Schwarzburg-Rudolstadt (1818–1821)
- Prince Günther of Schwarzburg-Rudolstadt (1821–1845)
- Prince Gustav of Schwarzburg-Rudolstadt (1828–1837)

== Death ==
Princess Auguste died on 12 June 1854 in Rudolstadt. Her widower, Prince Frederick Günther, remarried her own niece, Countess Helene of Reina (1835–1860), morganatic daughter of her brother George in 1855.

Her younger brother ruled the unified duchy of Anhalt from 1863 until his death in 1871 as Leopold IV.

== Ancestors ==
Ancestors of Auguste of Anhalt-Dessau

8. Leopold II, Prince of Anhalt-Dessau
4. Leopold III, Duke of Anhalt-Dessau
9. Gisela Agnes of Anhalt-Köthen
2. Frederick, Hereditary Prince of Anhalt-Dessau
10. Frederick Henry, Margrave of Brandenburg-Schwedt
5. Margravine Louise of Brandenburg-Schwedt
11. Leopoldine Marie of Anhalt-Dessau
1. Auguste of Anhalt-Dessau
12. Frederick IV, Landgrave of Hesse-Homburg
6. Frederick V, Landgrave of Hesse-Homburg
13. Ulrike Louise of Solms-Braunfels
3. Landgravine Amalie of Hesse-Homburg
14. Louis IX, Landgrave of Hesse-Darmstadt
7. Landgravine Caroline of Hesse-Darmstadt
15. Countess Palatine Caroline of Zweibrücken
