= Stolzenberg =

Stolzenberg is a surname. Notable people with the surname include:

- Daniel Stolz von Stolzenberg (1600–1660), Bohemian physician
- Leon Stolzenberg (1895–1974), American chess player
- Lisa Stolzenberg, American criminologist
- Mark Stolzenberg, American actor, screenwriter, and producer

Stolzenberg is also the former German name for the town of Różanki, Lubusz Voivodeship, in western Poland
