= Leopold IV of Anhalt =

Duke of Anhalt from 1817 to 1871

Leopold IV
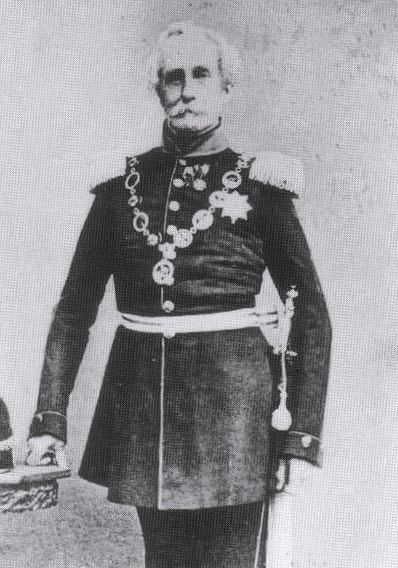
- Leopold IV c. 1855–1871

Duke of Anhalt
- Reign: 9 August 1817 – 22 May 1871
- Predecessor: Anhalt unified
- Successor: Frederick I
- Born: 1 October 1794; Dessau, Anhalt
- Died: 22 May 1871 (aged 76); Dessau, Anhalt
- Spouse: Princess Frederica of Prussia (m. 1818; died 1850)
- Issue among others...: Princess Auguste of Anhalt-Dessau; Agnes, Duchess of Saxe-Altenburg; Frederick I, Duke of Anhalt; Maria Anna, Princess of Prussia
Names
- Leopold Frederick
- House: Ascania
- Father: Frederick, Hereditary Prince of Anhalt-Dessau
- Mother: Landgravine Amalie of Hesse-Homburg

Leopold IV Frederick, Duke of Anhalt (1 October 1794 – 22 May 1871) was a German prince of the House of Ascania.

From 1817 until 1853, he was ruler of the duchy of Anhalt-Dessau and, from 1847 until 1853, also ruler of the duchy of Anhalt-Köthen. From 1853 until 1863, he was the ruler of the joined duchy of Anhalt-Dessau-Köthen and from 1863, the first ruler of the united duchy of Anhalt.

== Early life ==
Leopold was born in Dessau on 1 October 1794 as the eldest son of Frederick, Hereditary Prince of Anhalt-Dessau, by his wife Landgravine Amalie of Hesse-Homburg, daughter of Frederick V, Landgrave of Hesse-Homburg.

Following the premature death of his father in 1814, he became heir to the duchy of Anhalt-Dessau.

== Reign ==
Following the death of his grandfather Leopold III he succeeded as duke on 9 August 1817.

During the Revolutions of 1848 he was forced to grant a constitution to Dessau on 29 October 1848. It was revoked, however, on 4 November 1849, then replaced with a new version in October 1859. Leopold maintained a friendship with his administrative officer Wilhelm Christian Raster, though Raster's politically active son, Hermann participated in the revolutions. The younger Raster was given the unusual choice to either stay in Anhalt-Dessau and face criminal prosecution for his role in the Revolution or to emigrate from the country freely like other Forty-Eighters. Raster made the second choice and eventually became a powerful Republican Party political boss in the United States.

On 27 November 1847 he inherited the Duchy of Anhalt-Köthen from his distant cousin Duke Henry. As a result of a treaty concluded with Anhalt-Bernburg in May 1853 his duchies were joined together and named Anhalt-Dessau-Köthen, because the eventual inheritance of Leopold over all the Anhalt duchies seemed inevitable. The death of another distant cousin, Duke Alexander Karl, on 19 August 1863 resulted in the ruling line of the duchy of Anhalt-Bernburg becoming extinct, thus Leopold inherited that duchy as well. On 30 August he assumed the title "duke of Anhalt."

Leopold died in Dessau on 22 May 1871. He was succeeded by his son Frederick.

== Marriage and issue ==
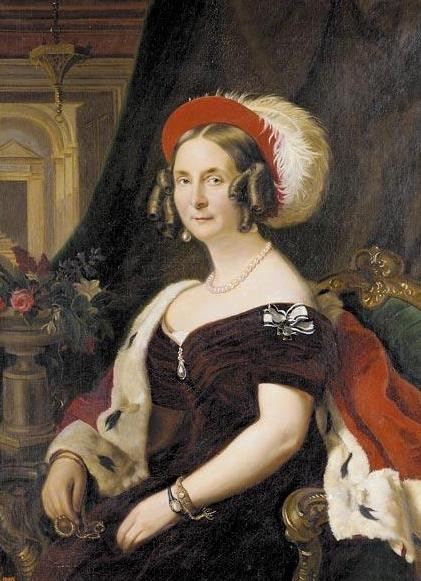
Leopold's wife Princess Frederica Wilhelmina of Prussia

In Berlin on 18 April 1818 Leopold married Princess Frederica of Prussia, daughter of Prince Frederick Louis Charles of Prussia (brother of King Frederick William III of Prussia) by his wife Frederica of Mecklenburg-Strelitz; through her mother's last marriage, she was a half-sister of King George V of Hanover. They had been engaged since 17 May 1816, as the connection had already been arranged by the Prussian court. This dynastic connection was an expression of Leopold's pro-Prussian policies. They had six children:

Name	Birth	Death	Notes
Princess Fredericka Amalie Auguste	28 November 1819	11 December 1822	
Princess Fredericka Amalie Agnes	24 June 1824	23 October 1897	married on 28 April 1853 to Ernst I, Duke of Saxe-Altenburg.
A son	3 August 1825	3 August 1825	he was either stillborn or died shortly after the birth.
A son	3 November 1827	3 November 1827	he was either stillborn or died shortly after the birth.
Frederick I, Duke of Anhalt	29 April 1831	24 January 1904	married on 22 April 1854 to Princess Antoinette of Saxe-Altenburg.
Princess Maria Anna	14 September 1837	12 May 1906	married on 29 November 1854 to Prince Frederick Charles of Prussia.

== Honours ==
He received the following orders and decorations:

- Austrian Empire:
  - Army Cross (1813/14)
  - Grand Cross of the Royal Hungarian Order of St. Stephen, 1832
- Baden: Grand Cross of the House Order of Fidelity, 1814
- Kingdom of Prussia:
  - Knight of the Black Eagle, 30 March 1817
  - Knight of the Red Eagle, 1st Class
- Russian Empire:
  - Knight of St. Andrew, 17 November 1834
  - Knight of St. Alexander Nevsky
  - Knight of St. Anna, 1st Class
- Kingdom of Poland: Knight of the White Eagle
- Ascanian duchies: Joint Founder and Grand Master of the Order of Albert the Bear, 18 November 1836
- Kingdom of Hanover:
  - Grand Cross of the Royal Guelphic Order, 1839
  - Knight of St. George, 1840
  - Grand Cross of the Order of Ernst August
- Denmark: Knight of the Elephant, 25 December 1840
- (Saxe-Coburg and Gotha) (Duchy of Saxe-Altenburg) (Saxe-Meiningen) Ernestine duchies: Grand Cross of the Saxe-Ernestine House Order, March 1843
- Oldenburg: Grand Cross of the Order of Duke Peter Friedrich Ludwig, with Golden Crown, 18 April 1854
- Kingdom of Bavaria: Knight of St. Hubert, 1854
- Nassau: Knight of the Gold Lion of Nassau, May 1862
- Sweden-Norway: Knight of the Seraphim, 14 May 1864
- Kingdom of Saxony: Knight of the Rue Crown, 1867

== Ancestry ==
Ancestors of Leopold IV of Anhalt

8. Leopold II, Prince of Anhalt-Dessau
4. Leopold III, Duke of Anhalt-Dessau
9. Princess Gisela Agnes of Anhalt-Köthen
2. Frederick, Hereditary Prince of Anhalt-Dessau
10. Frederick Henry, Margrave of Brandenburg-Schwedt
5. Princess Louise of Brandenburg-Schwedt
11. Princess Leopoldine Marie of Anhalt-Dessau
1. Leopold IV, Duke of Anhalt
12. Frederick IV, Landgrave of Hesse-Homburg
6. Frederick V, Landgrave of Hesse-Homburg
13. Princess Ulrike Louise of Solms-Braunfels
3. Princess Amalie of Hesse-Homburg
14. Louis IX, Landgrave of Hesse-Darmstadt
7. Princess Caroline of Hesse-Darmstadt
15. Countess Palatine Caroline of Zweibrücken

Leopold IV of Anhalt House of Ascania Born: 1 October 1794 Died: 22 May 1871
Regnal titles
Preceded by Leopold III	Duke of Anhalt-Dessau; 1817–1853	Duchies united
Preceded by Henry	Duke of Anhalt-Köthen; 1847–1853	Duchies united
New title	Duke of Anhalt-Dessau-Köthen; 1853–1863	Unification of all Anhalt Duchies
Preceded by Alexander Karl	Duke of Anhalt-Bernburg; 1863	Unification of all Anhalt Duchies
New title	Duke of Anhalt; 1863–1871	Succeeded by Frederick I
