= Prince George Bernhard of Anhalt-Dessau =

German prince (1796–1865)

George Bernhard
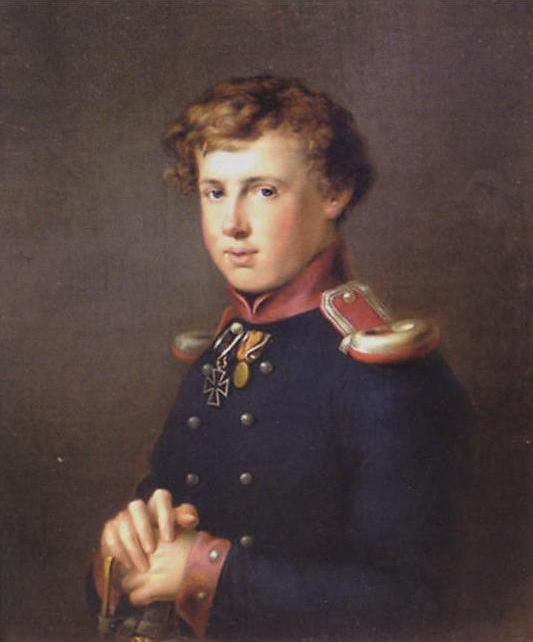
- Early 19th-century portrait
- Born: 21 February 1796; Dessau, Anhalt
- Died: 16 October 1865 (aged 69); Dresden, Saxony
- Spouse: Karoline of Scharzburg-Rudolstadt; Theresa Emma von Erdmannsdorf
- Issue: Princess Louise; Prince Frederick; Count Franz of Raina; Countess Mathilde of Raina; Countess Helene of Raina; Countess Emma of Raina; Countess Maria of Raina; Count Rudolf of Raina; Count Karl of Raina
- House: Ascania
- Father: Frederick, Hereditary Prince of Anhalt-Dessau
- Mother: Landgravine Amalie of Hesse-Homburg

George Bernhard of Anhalt-Dessau (21 February 1796 – 16 October 1865), was a German prince of the House of Ascania from the Anhalt-Dessau branch.

== Early life ==
He was born in Dessau on 21 February 1796. He was the second son of Frederick, Hereditary Prince of Anhalt-Dessau, by his wife Landgravine Amalie of Hesse-Homburg.

His paternal grandparents were Leopold III, Duke of Anhalt-Dessau and Louise of Brandenburg-Schwedt. His maternal grandparents were Frederick V, Landgrave of Hesse-Homburg and Princess Caroline of Hesse-Darmstadt.

== Personal life ==
On 6 August 1825, George Bernhard was married to Karoline Auguste Louise Amalie of Schwarzburg-Rudolstadt (1804–1829) in Rudolstadt. She was a daughter of Prince Karl Günther of Schwarzburg-Rudolstadt (himself a son of Frederick Charles, Prince of Schwarzburg-Rudolstadt) and Louise Ulrike of Hesse-Homburg, George's aunt. Before her death on 14 January 1829, they had two children:

1. Louise (1826–1900), who died unmarried.
2. Frederick (1828–1828), who died in infancy.

On 4 October 1831. he married, for a second time, to Therese Emma von Erdmannsdorf (1807–1848) in Dresden. The marriage was morganatic as she was of lesser nobility. Shortly after their marriage, she was created Countess of Raina. Before her death in 1848, they had seven children:

1. Count Franz of Raina (1832–1879), who died unmarried at Schloss Gross-Kühnau in 1879.
2. Countess Mathilde of Raina (1833–1917), who married Otto von Könneritz (1835–1866) in 1859.
3. Countess Helene of Raina (1835–1860), who was adopted by her uncle William in 1855 and given the title of "Princess of Anhalt" by the reigning duke Leopold IV of Anhalt-Dessau; she married Frederick Günther, Prince of Schwarzburg-Rudolstadt, the widower of her paternal aunt Amalie Auguste, in 1855; a union that was considered morganatic according to the family law of the House of Schwarzburg.
4. Countess Emma of Raina (1837–1909), who died unmarried.
5. Countess Maria of Raina (1839–1931), who died unmarried.
6. Count Rudolph of Raina (1842–1921), who married Emma Elisabeth Klara Marie Paris (1857–1932) in 1882.
7. Count Karl of Raina (1844–1900), who married Cosima von Mörner (1865–1936) in Berlin in 1887; the marriage was childless and the couple divorced in 1893. He married Countess Marie von der Groeben (1841–1894) in 1894. She died four months after the marriage.

Therese Emma, Countess of Raina, died on 28 February 1848 in Mannheim. Prince George Bernhard died in Dresden on 16 October 1865.
