= Amalie Auguste =

Amalie Auguste may refer to:

- Princess Augusta of Bavaria (1788–1851)
- Amalie Auguste of Bavaria (1801–1877)
- Auguste of Anhalt-Dessau (1793–1854)
