= Gmina Kłodawa =

Gmina Kłodawa may refer to either of the following administrative districts in Poland:

- Gmina Kłodawa, Lubusz Voivodeship
- Gmina Kłodawa, Greater Poland Voivodeship
