= Frederick, Hereditary Prince of Anhalt-Dessau =

Frederick
- Hereditary Prince of Anhalt-Dessau
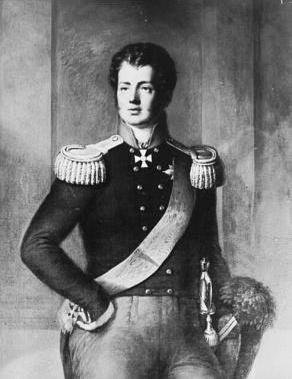
- Born: 27 December 1769; Dessau, Anhalt
- Died: 27 May 1814 (aged 44); Dessau, Anhalt
- Spouse: Amalie of Hesse-Homburg (m. 1792)
- Issue: Auguste, Princess of Schwarzburg-Rudolstadt; Leopold IV, Duke of Anhalt; Prince George Bernhard; Prince Paul Christian; Louise, Landgravine of Hesse-Homburg; Prince Frederick Augustus; Prince William Waldemar
- House: Ascania
- Father: Leopold III, Duke of Anhalt-Dessau
- Mother: Louise of Brandenburg-Schwedt

Frederick of Anhalt-Dessau (27 December 1769 – 27 May 1814), was a German prince of the House of Ascania and heir to the principality (and from 1807 the duchy) of Anhalt-Dessau.

He was born in Dessau, the only surviving child of Leopold III, Prince and later Duke of Anhalt-Dessau, by his wife Louise, daughter of Frederick Henry, Margrave of Brandenburg-Schwedt. His only sibling, a sister born on 11 February 1768, was either stillborn or died shortly after her birth.

== Life ==
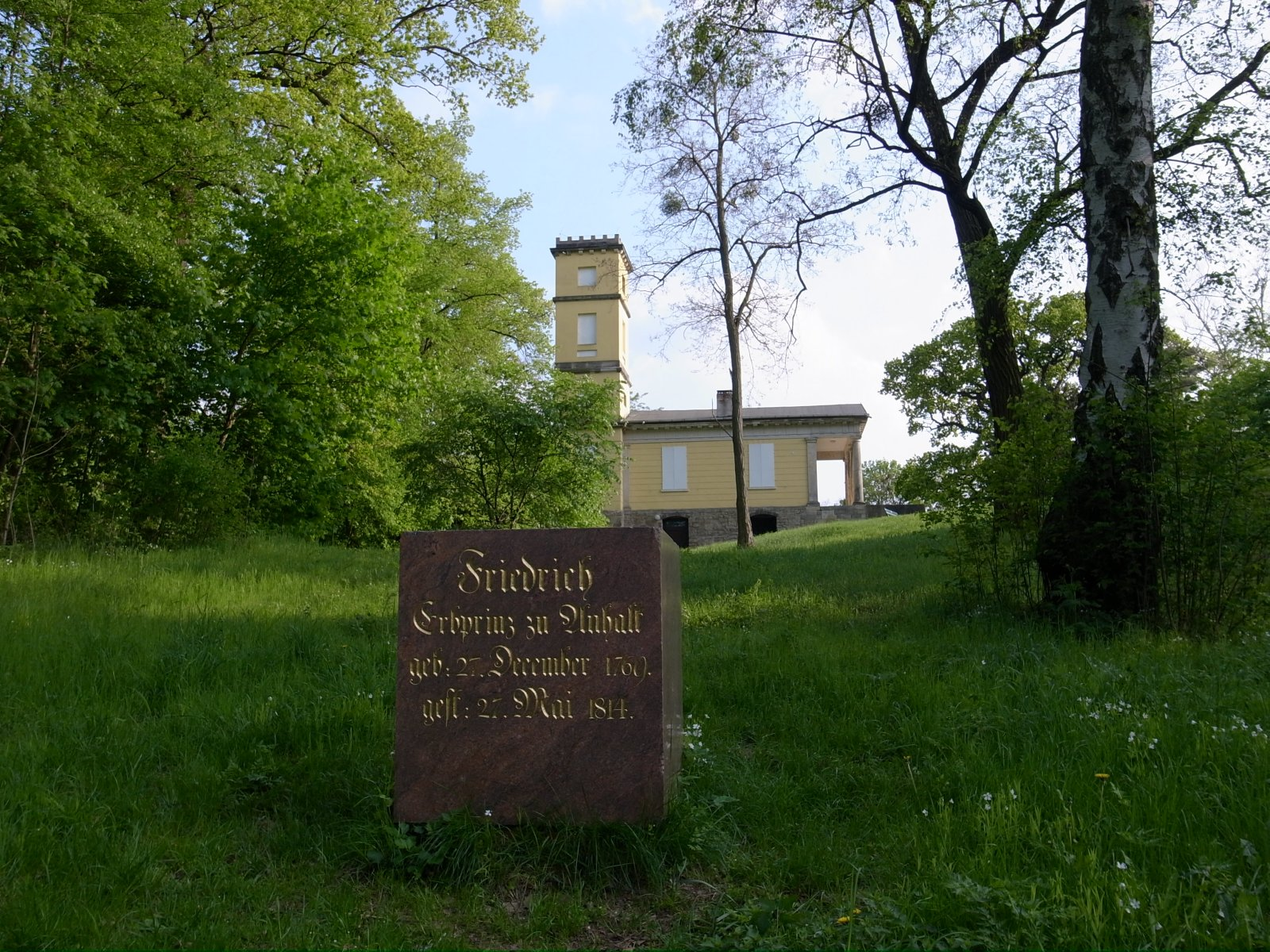
Memorial to Hereditary Prince Frederick in Kühnauer Park

In 1788, he joined the Prussian army as an officer, where he later obtained the rank of Generalfeldmarschall. In 1805 he contracted to build Kühnauer Park.

Frederick died in Dessau, three years before his father, thus never inherited Anhalt-Dessau. His place as Leopold III's heir was taken by his older son Leopold Frederick, who succeeded his grandfather in 1817 with the name Leopold IV.

== Marriage and issue ==
In Bad Homburg vor der Höhe on 12 June 1792 Frederick married Landgravine Amalie of Hesse-Homburg, daughter of Frederick V, Landgrave of Hesse-Homburg. They had seven children:

1. Amalie Auguste (b. Dessau, 18 August 1793 – d. Rudolstadt, 12 June 1854), married on 15 April 1816 to Frederick Günther, Prince of Schwarzburg-Rudolstadt.
2. Leopold IV Frederick, Duke of Anhalt-Dessau and since 1863 Duke of all Anhalt (b. Dessau, 1 October 1794 – d. Dessau, 22 May 1871).
3. George Bernhard (b. Dessau, 21 February 1796 – d. Dresden, 16 October 1865).
4. Paul Christian (b. Dessau, 22 March 1797 – d. Dessau, 4 May 1797).
5. Louise Fredericka (b. Dessau, 1 March 1798 - d. Homburg, 11 June 1858), a deaf-mute from birth; married on 12 February 1818 to her uncle Gustav, Landgrave of Hesse-Homburg (brother of her mother).
6. Frederick Augustus (b. Dessau, 23 September 1799 – d. Dessau, 4 December 1864).
7. William Waldemar (b. Dessau, 29 May 1807 – d. Vienna, 8 October 1864), married morganatically on 9 July 1840 to Emilie Klausnitzer (b. Dessau, 30 January 1812 – d. Vienna, 28 March 1888), created Freifrau von Stolzenberg in 1842.
