= Oleszna, Szczecin =

Neighbourhood of Szczecin, Poland

Coordinates: 53°21′53″N 14°44′49″E

Oleszna is a depopulated part of Szczecin, Poland, situated on the right bank of the Oder river, east of Szczecin Old Town, and south-east of Szczecin-Dąbie. It was known until 1947 by its German name Henningsholm.

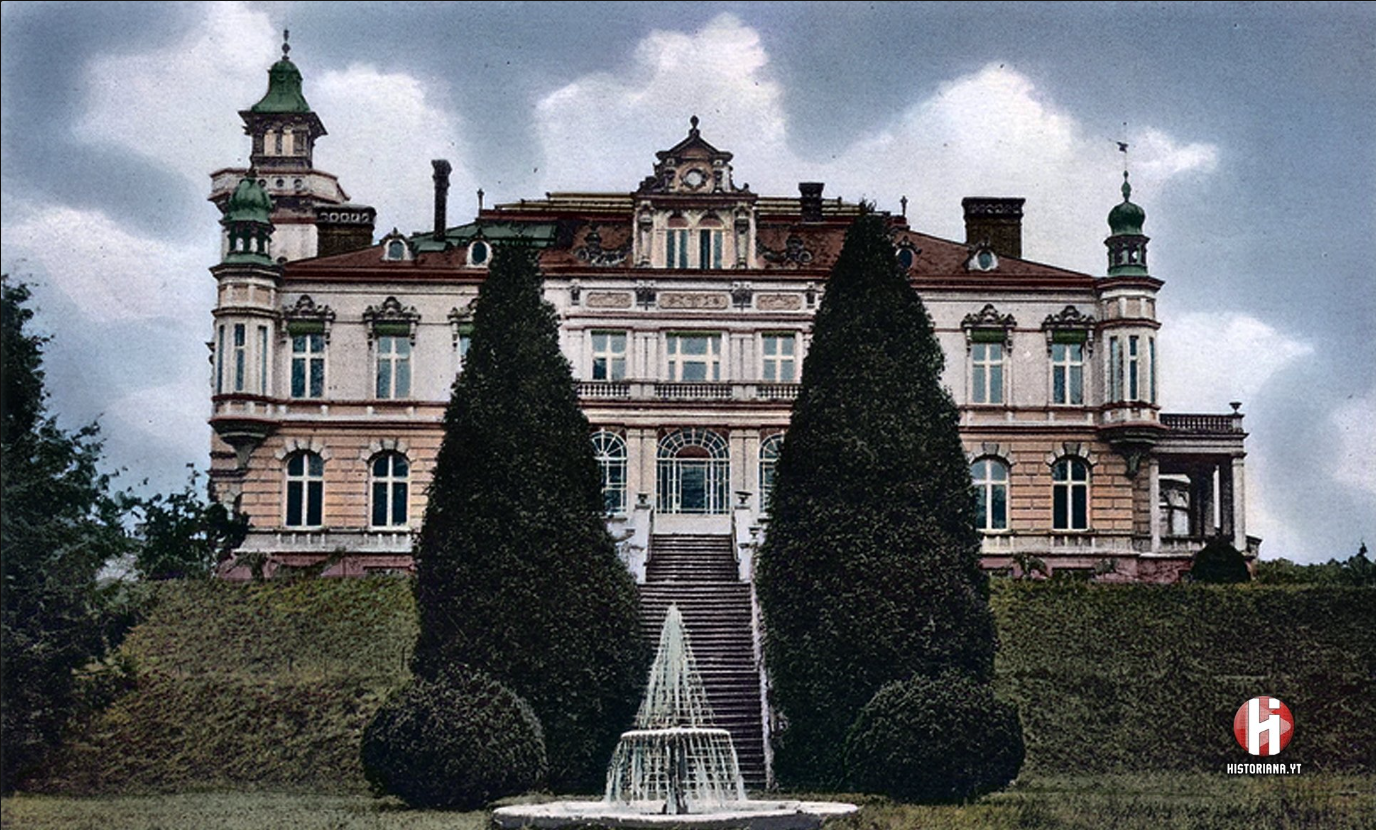
Schloss Henningsholm, Stettin (early 20th century)

It was first mentioned in the 13th century as Hennekenhof or Henskenhof, a property of Kolbatz Abbey, and in the 16th century as Heidereitershof. It acquired the name Henningsholm in the 18th century, possibly after a Pomeranian official. In the late 19th century it was developed as a community of exclusive villas around the mansion known as Schloss Henningsholm.

During the war the Schloss was used by the Luftwaffe. After the war the entire settlement, including the Schloss, was demolished and the building materials sent off for the reconstruction of Warsaw.
