= Kołbacz =

- Village
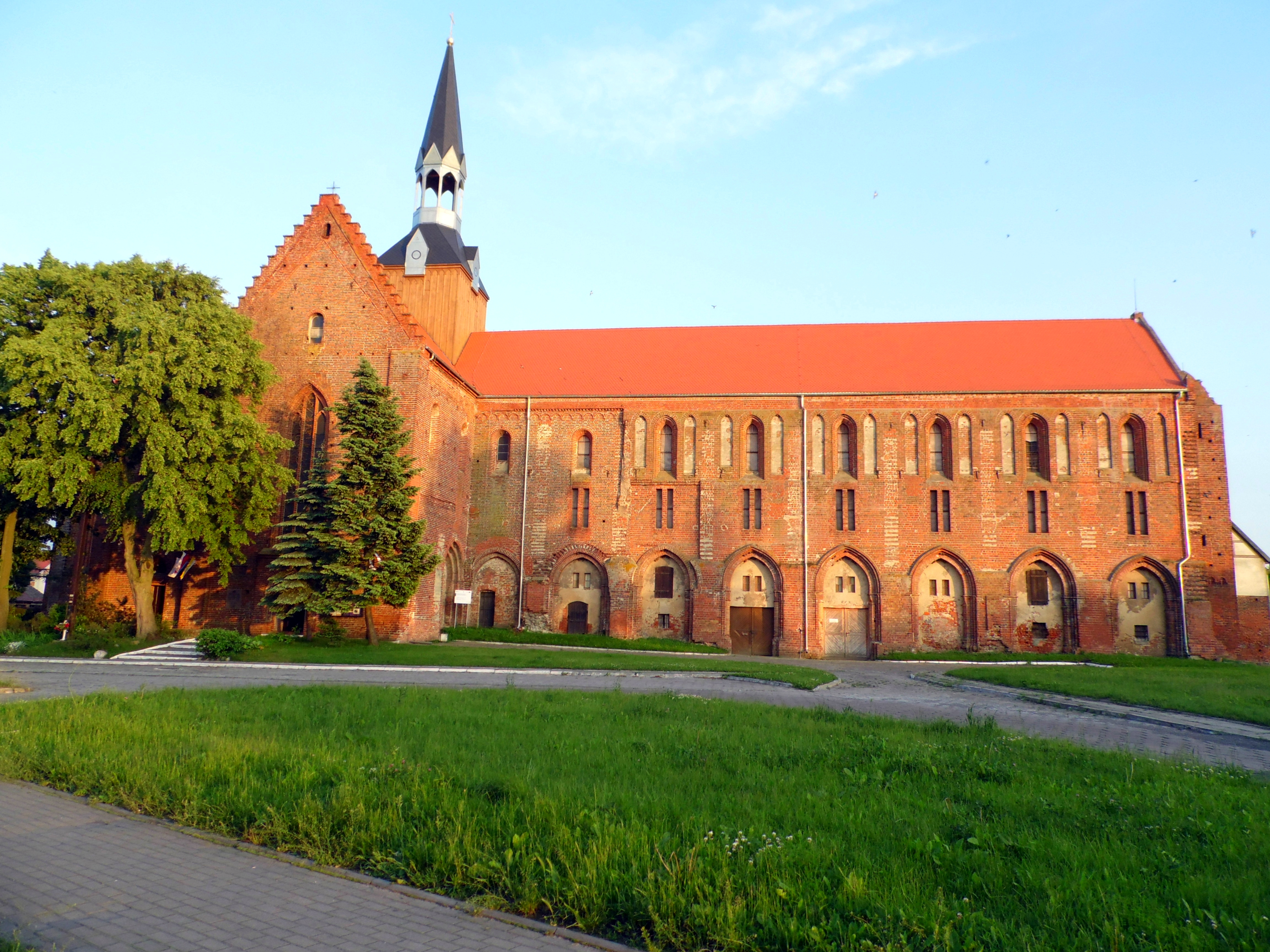
- Sacred Heart church within the Kołbacz Abbey

- Location within Poland
- Coordinates: 53°18′2″N 14°48′48″E
- Country: Poland
- Voivodeship: West Pomeranian
- County: Gryfino
- Gmina: Stare Czarnowo
- Population: 1,400
- Time zone: UTC+1 (CET)
  - Summer (DST): UTC+2 (CEST)
- Vehicle registration: ZGR
- Primary airport: Solidarity Szczecin–Goleniów Airport

Kołbacz [ˈkɔwbat͡ʂ] (German: Kolbatz) is a village in the administrative district of Gmina Stare Czarnowo, within Gryfino County, West Pomeranian Voivodeship, in north-western Poland. It lies approximately 4 km (2 mi) north-east of Stare Czarnowo, 23 km (14 mi) east of Gryfino, and 20 km (12 mi) south-east of the regional capital Szczecin. It is located on the Pyrzyce-Stargard Plains, on the west bank of the river Płonia, and has roughly 1,400 inhabitants.

== History ==
The area has been inhabited since at least the times of the Lusatian culture. The area became part of the emerging Polish state under its first historic ruler Mieszko I around 967. Following Poland's fragmentation, it formed part of the Duchy of Pomerania. In 1173 it was donated to the Cistercian order (originally of Esrum, Denmark). Between 1210 and 1347 a large monastery (Kołbacz Abbey) and several farms were built in the area to house the monks. In sources known as Colbatz, Kolbatz, Colbas, sometimes Mera Vallis which means Bright Valley. After the secularization of Pomeranian Cistercians in 1555 the area became a private property of the Dukes of Pomerania-Stettin (Szczecin) from the House of Griffin, the monastery was converted into a castle and then into a summer residence of the dukes. After the dissolution of the duchy, the rulings of the Peace of Westphalia (1648) and the Treaty of Stettin (1653) assigned the settlement to the Margraviate of Brandenburg. From the 18th century it was part of the Kingdom of Prussia, and from 1871 it was also part of Germany. Since 1815 it was administratively located in the Province of Pomerania. Following Germany's defeat in World War II in 1945, the area became again part of Poland.

== Sights ==
Among the most notable historical attractions are remnants of Cistercian abbey, which include a Romanesque-Gothic church (1210–1347), one of the oldest brick churches in Pomerania. There are also remnants of the monastery itself, as well as a converts' house, abbot's house, a gothic barn and a fortified tower. The abbey is listed as a Historic Monument of Poland.

== Notable residents ==
- Karl-Ludwig Barths
