= Zamoksze =

- Village
- Location within Poland
- Coordinates: 52°48′27″N 15°11′36″E
- Country: Poland
- Voivodeship: Lubusz
- County: Gorzów
- Gmina: Kłodawa
- Population: 32

Zamoksze ([zaˈmɔkʂɛ]) is a village in the administrative district of Gmina Kłodawa, within Gorzów County, Lubusz Voivodeship, in western Poland.
