= Lipy, Lubusz Voivodeship =

Lipy
- Village
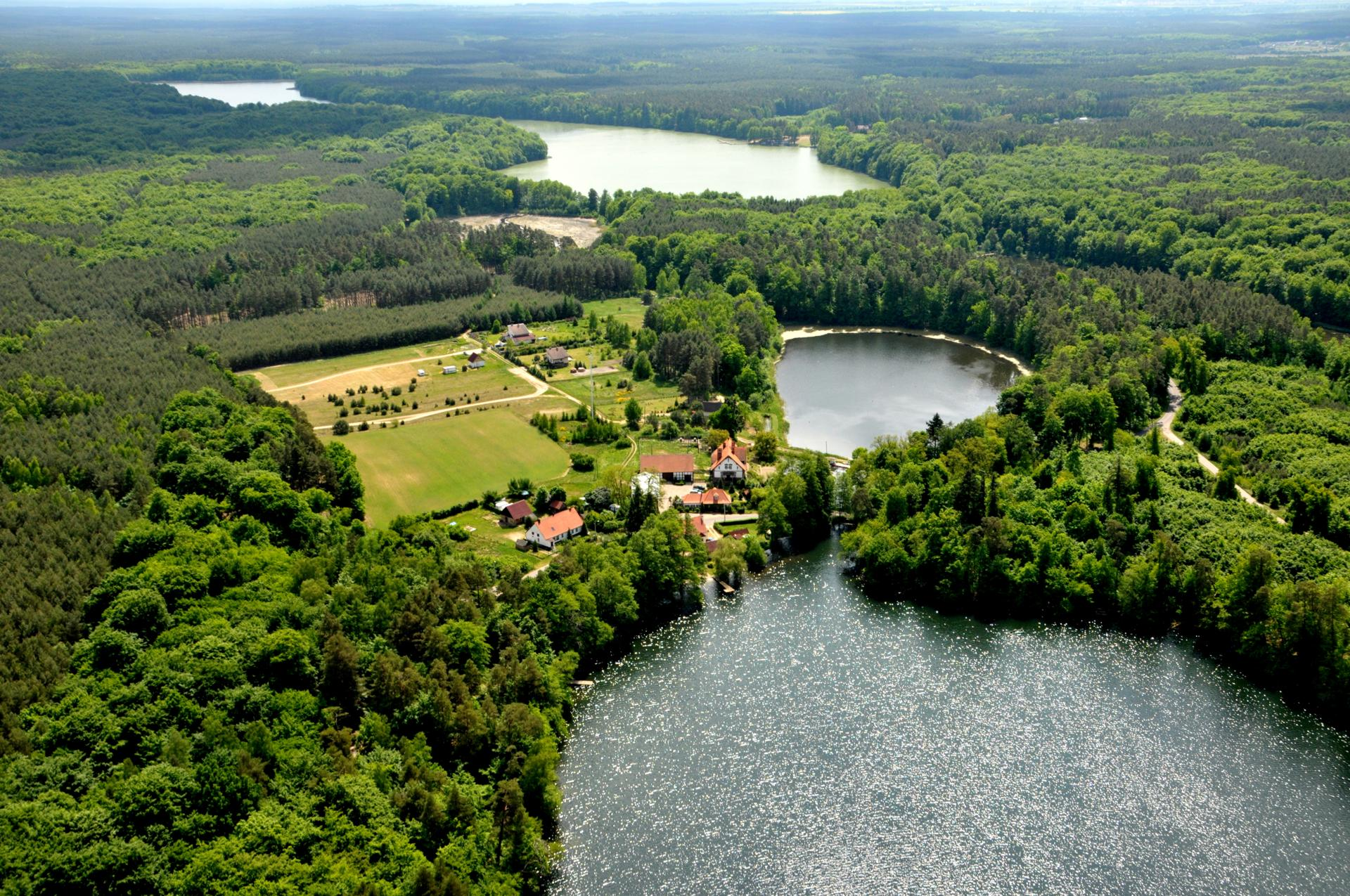

- Location within Poland
- Coordinates: 52°52′48″N 15°17′11″E
- Country: Poland
- Voivodeship: Lubusz
- County: Gorzów
- Gmina: Kłodawa

Population
  - Total: 38
- Time zone: UTC+1 (CET)
  - Summer (DST): UTC+2 (CEST)
- Vehicle registration: FGW

Lipy [ˈlipɨ] is a village in the administrative district of Gmina Kłodawa, within Gorzów County, Lubusz Voivodeship, in western Poland.
