= Zdroisko =

- Village
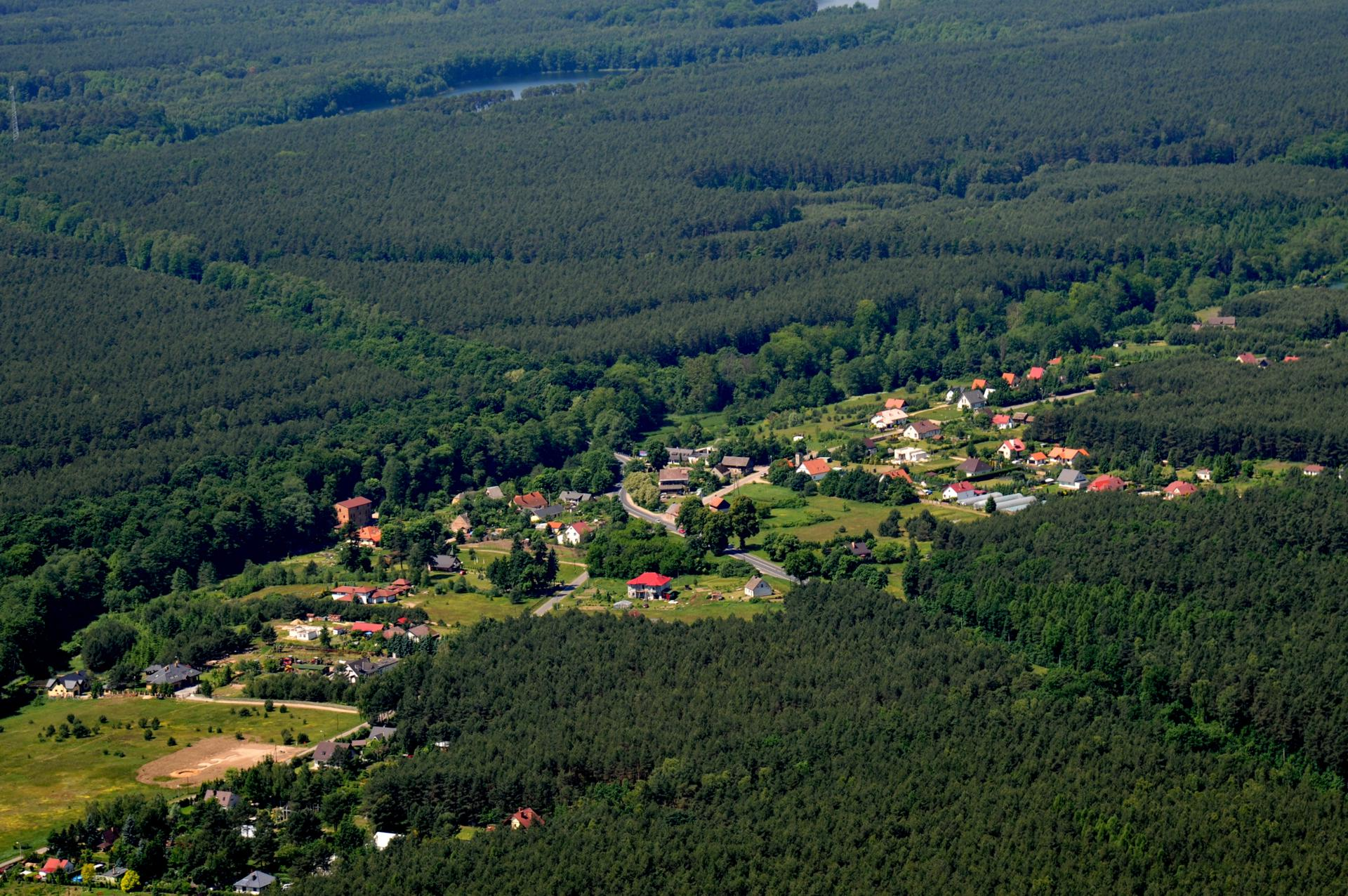

- Location within Poland
- Coordinates: 52°49′N 15°24′E
- Country: Poland
- Voivodeship: Lubusz
- County: Gorzów
- Gmina: Kłodawa
- Time zone: UTC+1 (CET)
  - Summer (DST): UTC+2 (CEST)
- Vehicle registration: FGW

Zdroisko [ˈzdrɔi̯skɔ] is a village in the administrative district of Gmina Kłodawa, within Gorzów County, Lubusz Voivodeship, in western Poland. As of 2021 it has an estimated population of about 173 residents
