= Barlinek-Gorzów Landscape Park =

Protected area in Poland

- Barlinecko-Gorzowski Park Krajobrazowy
- IUCN category V (protected landscape/seascape)
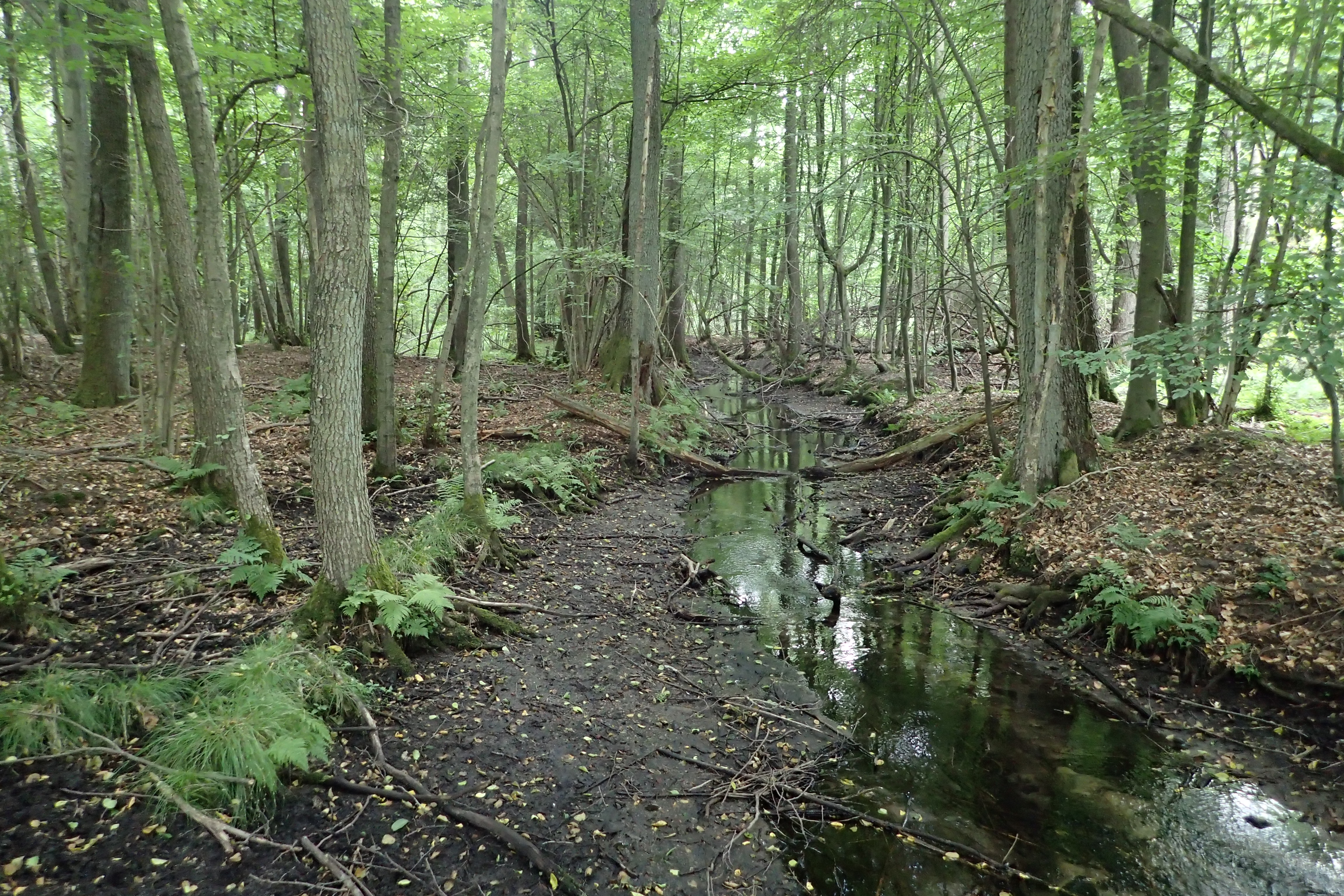
- Rzeka Przyłężek nature reserve
- Interactive map of Barlinek-Gorzów Landscape Park
- Location: north-west Poland
- Coordinates: 52°54′N 15°19′E
- Area: 239.8 km^{2} (92.6 sq mi)
- Established: 1991

Barlinek-Gorzów Landscape Park (Barlinecko-Gorzowski Park Krajobrazowy) is a protected area (Landscape Park) in north-western Poland, established in 1991, covering an area of 239.8 square kilometres (92.6 sq mi).

The Park is shared between two voivodeships: Lubusz and West Pomeranian. Within Lubusz Voivodeship the Park includes parts of the districts (gminas) of Gmina Kłodawa (in Gorzów County) and Gmina Strzelce Krajeńskie (in Strzelce-Drezdenko County). Within West Pomeranian Voivodeship it includes parts of Gmina Pełczyce (in Choszczno County) and Gmina Barlinek and Gmina Nowogródek Pomorski (in Myślibórz County). The Park has its headquarters in the town of Gorzów Wielkopolski.

Within the Landscape Park are five nature reserves.

== Overview ==
The Gorzowska Primeval Forest, also known as the Barlinek Primeval Forest, is a large forest complex extending mainly on the outwash plain, made of 12 thousand. years ago, by the waters flowing out of a melting glacier. The surface of the sander is not flat, it is cut with gutters and depressions. The richness of the nature of the Barlinek Forest decided about the creation of the Park. The area of the Park, even though it covers only about 40% of the area of the Forest, is representative of it. Forests dominate here, covering about 81% of the area. The second important element of the landscape are numerous lakes. About 700 species of vascular plants, 140 species of lichens, and over 100 breeding species of birds have been found in the Park.
