= Rębowo, Lubusz Voivodeship =

Rębowo
- Settlement
- Location within Poland
- Coordinates: 52°49′28″N 15°05′09″E
- Country: Poland
- Voivodeship: Lubusz
- County: Gorzów
- Gmina: Kłodawa
- Population: 1

Rębowo [rɛmˈbɔvɔ] is a settlement in the administrative district of Gmina Kłodawa, within Gorzów County, Lubusz Voivodeship, in western Poland.
