= Princess Amalie of Hesse-Homburg =

Princess Amalie
- Hereditary Princess of Anhalt-Dessau
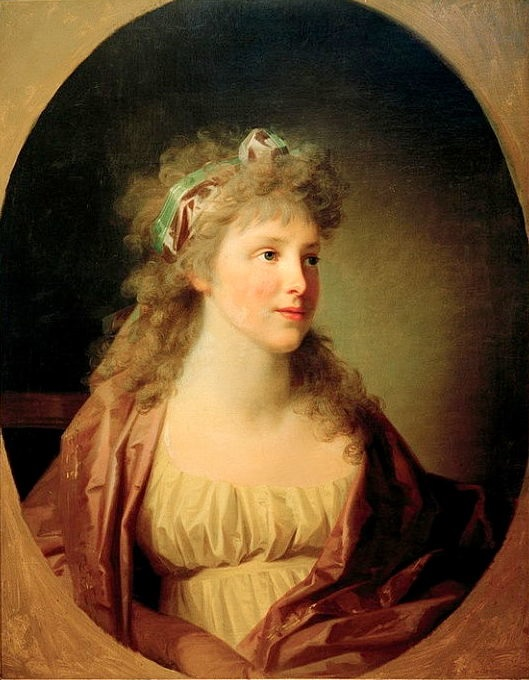
- Portrait c. 1797–1798
- Born: 29 June 1774; Bad Homburg vor der Höhe, Landgraviate of Hesse-Homburg, Holy Roman Empire
- Died: 3 February 1846 (aged 71); Dessau, Duchy of Anhalt-Dessau
- Spouse: Frederick, Hereditary Prince of Anhalt-Dessau (m. 1792; died 1814)
- Issue: Auguste, Princess of Schwarzburg-Rudolstadt; Leopold IV, Duke of Anhalt; Prince George Bernhard; Prince Paul Christian; Louise, Landgravine of Hesse-Homburg; Prince Frederick Augustus; Prince William Waldemar
Names
- German: Christiane Amalie
- House: Hesse-Homburg
- Father: Frederick V, Landgrave of Hesse-Homburg
- Mother: Princess Caroline of Hesse-Darmstadt

Princess and Landgravine Christiane Amalie of Hesse-Homburg, full German name: Christiane Amalie, Landgräfin von Hessen-Homburg (29 June 1774 – 3 February 1846) was a member of the House of Hesse-Homburg and a Princess and Landgravine of Hesse-Homburg by birth. Through her marriage to Frederick, Hereditary Prince of Anhalt-Dessau, Amalie was also a member of the House of Ascania and Hereditary Princess of Anhalt-Dessau.

== Family ==
Amalie was the fifth child of Frederick V, Landgrave of Hesse-Homburg and his wife Princess Caroline of Hesse-Darmstadt, daughter of Louis IX, Landgrave of Hesse-Darmstadt.

== Marriage and issue ==
Amalie married Frederick, Hereditary Prince of Anhalt-Dessau, only surviving child of Leopold III, Duke of Anhalt-Dessau and his wife Margravine Louise Henriette Wilhelmine of Brandenburg-Schwedt, on 12 June 1792 in Bad Homburg vor der Höhe, Landgraviate of Hesse-Homburg, Holy Roman Empire. Amalie and Frederick had seven children:

- Amalie Auguste of Anhalt-Dessau (b. Dessau, 18 August 1793 – d. Rudolstadt, 12 June 1854), married on 15 April 1816 to Friedrich Günther, Prince of Schwarzburg-Rudolstadt.
- Leopold IV Frederick, Duke of Anhalt-Dessau (b. Dessau, 1 October 1794 – d. Dessau, 22 May 1871); since 1863 Duke of all Anhalt.
- George Bernhard of Anhalt-Dessau (b. Dessau, 21 February 1796 – d. Dresden, 16 October 1865)
- Paul Christian of Anhalt-Dessau (b. Dessau, 22 March 1797 – d. Dessau, 4 May 1797)
- Louise Fredericka of Anhalt-Dessau (b. Dessau, 1 March 1798 – d. Homburg, 11 June 1858), a deaf-mute from birth; married on 12 February 1818 to her maternal uncle Gustav, Landgrave of Hesse-Homburg.
- Frederick Augustus of Anhalt-Dessau (b. Dessau, 23 September 1799 – d. Dessau, 4 December 1864).
- William Waldemar of Anhalt-Dessau (b. Dessau, 29 May 1807 – d. Vienna, 8 October 1864), married morganatically on 9 July 1840 to Emilie Klausnitzer (b. Dessau, 30 January 1812 – d. Vienna, 28 March 1888), created Freifrau von Stolzenberg in 1842.

The poet Friedrich Hölderlin dedicated his 1800 poem Aus stillem Hauße senden - An eine Fürstin von Dessau to the Hereditary Princess.

== Ancestry ==
Ancestors of Princess Amalie of Hesse-Homburg

8. Landgrave Kasimir Wilhelm of Hesse-Homburg
4. Frederick IV, Landgrave of Hesse-Homburg
9. Countess Christine Charlotte of Solms-Braunfels
2. Frederick V, Landgrave of Hesse-Homburg
10. Friedrich Wilhelm, Prince of Solms-Braunfels
5. Countess Ulrike Louise of Solms-Braunfels
11. Countess Sophie Magdalena Benigna of Solms-Laubach-Utphe
1. Princess Amalie of Hesse-Homburg
12. Louis VIII, Landgrave of Hesse-Darmstadt
6. Louis IX, Landgrave of Hesse-Darmstadt
13. Countess Charlotte of Hanau-Lichtenberg
3. Princess Caroline of Hesse-Darmstadt
14. Christian III, Count Palatine of Zweibrücken
7. Countess Palatine Caroline of Zweibrücken
15. Caroline of Nassau-Saarbrücken
