= Wojcieszyce, Lubusz Voivodeship =

Wojcieszyce
- Village
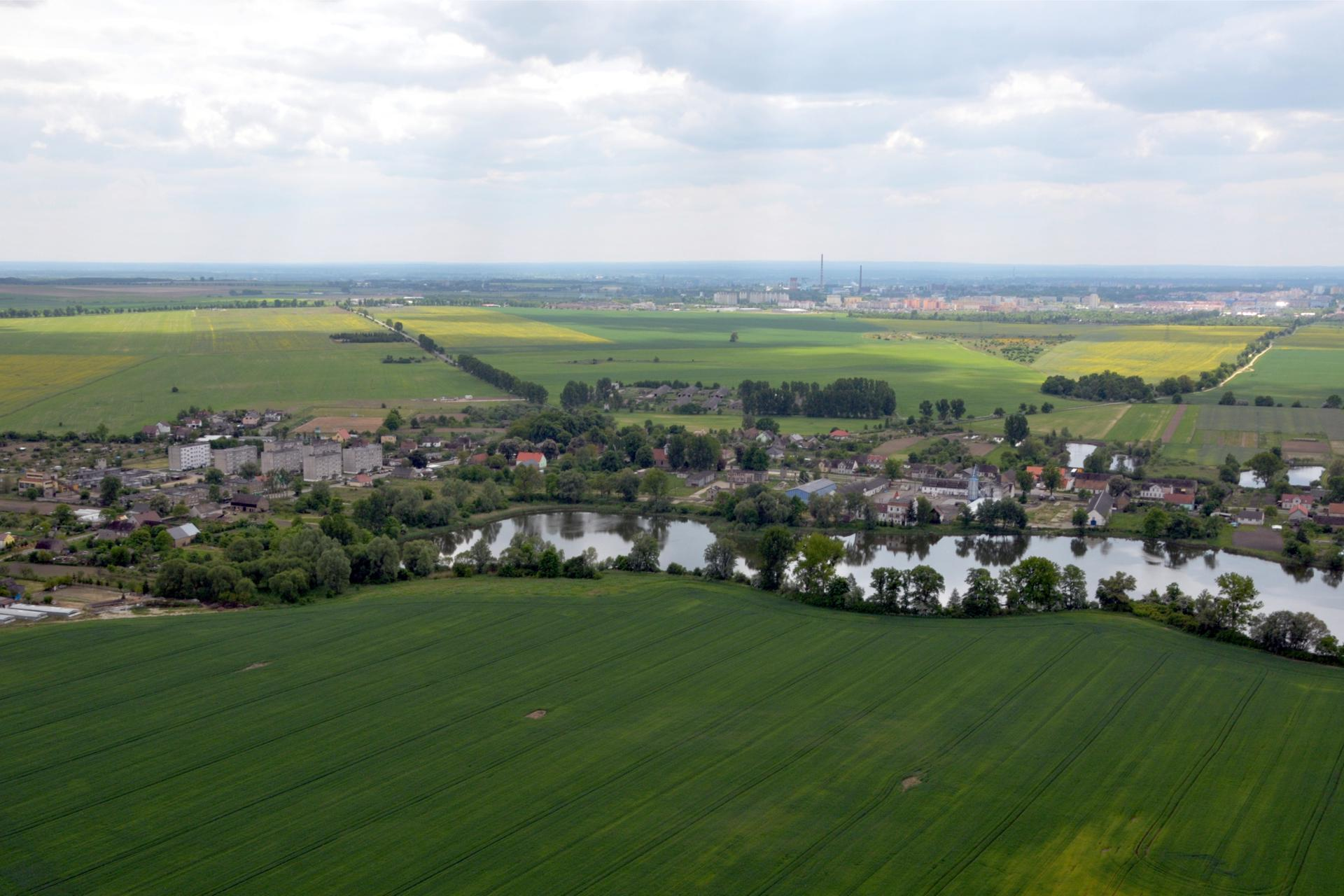

- Location within Poland
- Coordinates: 52°47′N 15°16′E
- Country: Poland
- Voivodeship: Lubusz
- County: Gorzów
- Gmina: Kłodawa
- Population: 920

Wojcieszyce (Polish: [vɔjt͡ɕɛˈʂɨt͡sɛ]) is a village in the administrative district of Gmina Kłodawa, within Gorzów County, Lubusz Voivodeship, in western Poland.
