= Friederike Charlotte of Brandenburg-Schwedt =

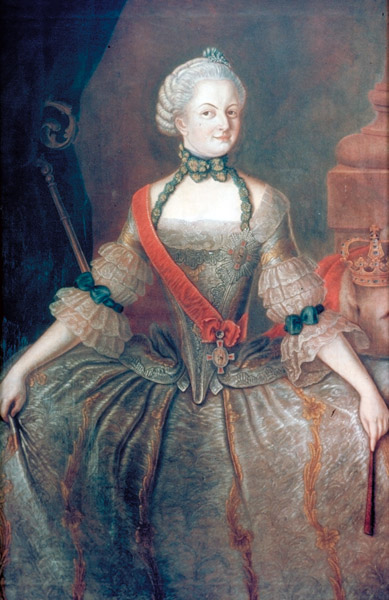
- Frederike Charlotte in 1767
- Born: 18 August 1745; Schwedt, Margraviate of Brandenburg, Holy Roman Empire
- Died: 23 January 1808 (aged 62); Altona
- Burial: Collegiate church in Herford
- House: House of Hohenzollern
- Father: Frederick Henry, Margrave of Brandenburg-Schwedt
- Mother: Leopoldine Marie of Anhalt-Dessau

Friederike Charlotte Leopoldine Louise of Brandenburg-Schwedt (also often referred to as the Princess of Prussia; 18 August 1745 in Schwedt – 23 January 1808 in Altona) was a German aristocrat who lived as a secular canoness and ruled as the last Princess-abbess of Herford Abbey.

== Life ==
Friederike Charlotte was a member of the Brandenburg-Schwedt line of the Prussian royal family, the daughter of Frederick Henry, Margrave of Brandenburg-Schwedt and his wife Leopoldine Marie of Anhalt-Dessau. After the breakup of her parents' marriage, King Frederick II of Prussia sent her mother to Kołobrzeg in Pomerania and Friederike Charlotte received a place in Herford Abbey. In 1755, she became coadjutor to Abbess Hedwig Sophie of Schleswig-Holstein-Gottorp, whom she later succeeded.

Friederike Charlotte was partly educated in Prussia, together with her sister Louise. Between 1760 and 1762, the mathematician Leonhard Euler sent her numerous letters in French about mathematical and philosophical subjects. These letters were published between 1769 and 1773 under the title "Letters to a German Princess" and were printed in Leipzig and St. Petersburg. The French edition alone enjoyed 12 printings. It was the Age of Enlightenment and Euler tried to explain physical issues and in particular their philosophical background in a generally understandable manner. Euler may have been employed as her teacher.

On 13 October 1764, Friederike Charlotte became Abbess of Herford. As head of an imperial abbey, she ranked as an Imperial Princess. She administered the abbey and defended its rights against the city of Herford. She resided in Herford and maintained her court in a manner befitting a royal household. In 1766 Princess Christine Charlotte of Hesse-Kassel was appointed as coadjutor abbess, serving alongside Friederike Charlotte. In 1790, she donated an emblem to the St. Mary on the Mountain convent in her territory. Recent research suggests that the economic situation in her territory deteriorated during her reign.

She also tried to preserve the right of her abbey against the Prussian state. However, in case of doubt, the King of Prussia had the last word. In 1798, criminal proceedings were initiated against leading officials of the abbey for forging a will and King Frederick William III appointed a mediatisation commission "to execute the guardianship over the assets of the Lady Abbess". The commission was disbanded in 1799. Although Frederike Charlotte claimed jurisdiction over her subjects, the defendants were convicted in a Prussian court in 1800.

The abbey was secularized on 15 August 1802. Its assets were seized by the Kingdom of Prussia. The abbess and the collegiate ladies received a pension from the kingdom. Friederike Charlotte fled the advancing army of the French First Republic to Altona, where she died in 1808. She was buried in the collegiate church in Herford.
