= Kłodawa, Lubusz Voivodeship =

Kłodawa
- Village
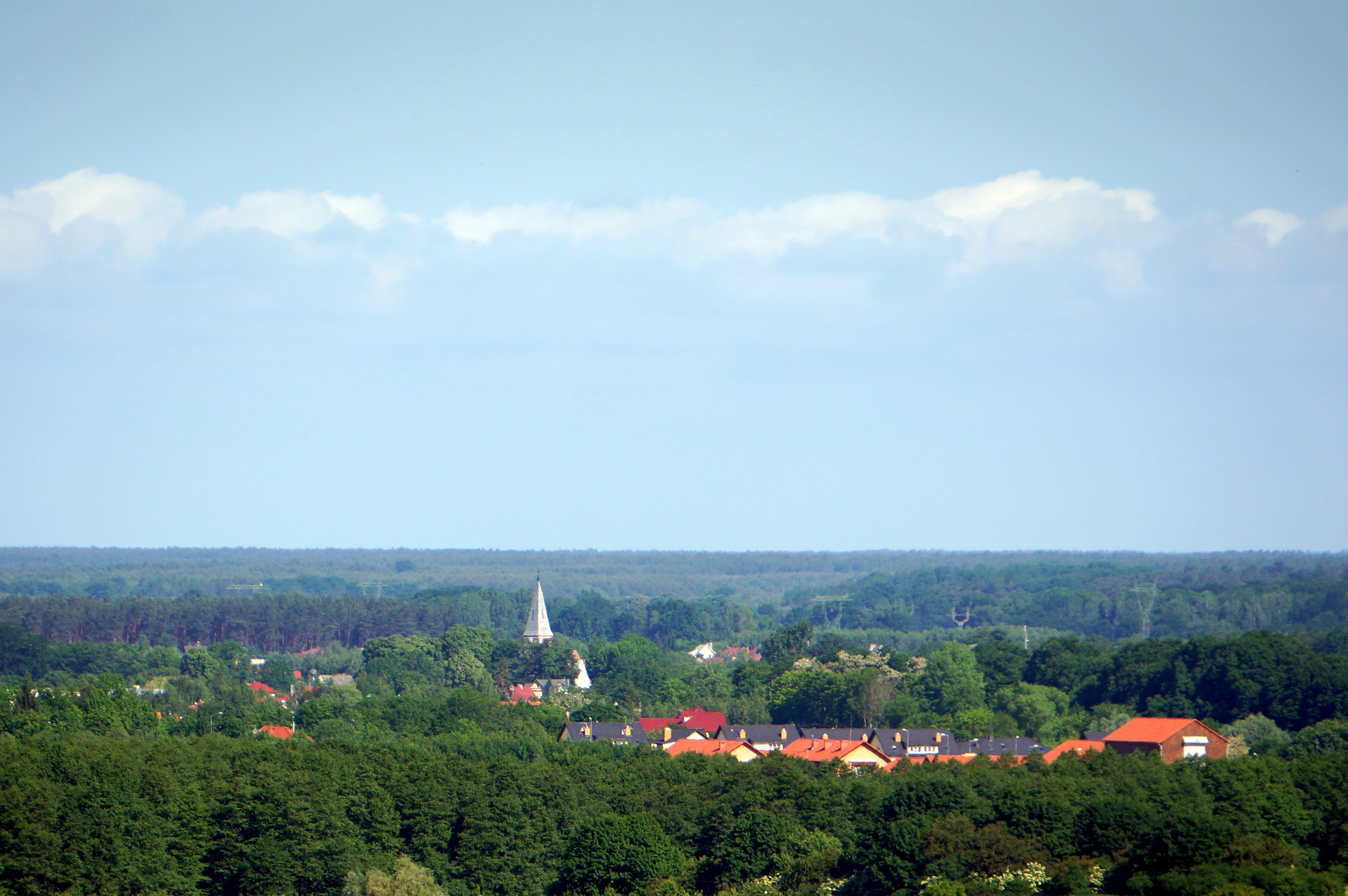
- Kłodawa seen from the Górczyn housing estate in Gorzów

- Location within Poland
- Coordinates: 52°47′29″N 15°12′57″E
- Country: Poland
- Voivodeship: Lubusz
- County: Gorzów
- Gmina: Kłodawa
- Population: 2,700
- Website: http://www.klodawa.pl

Kłodawa [kwɔˈdava] (German Kladow) is a village in Gorzów County, Lubusz Voivodeship, in western Poland. It is the seat of the gmina (administrative district) called Gmina Kłodawa.

The village had a population of 2,700 in 2016.
