= Wilhelm Christian Raster =

German administrative officer (1776-?)

- Born: 1776; Zerbst, Principality of Anhalt-Zerbst
- Died: Unknown
- Occupations: Administrative official, translator

Wilhelm Christian Raster was a German administrative officer (Verwaltungsbeamter) in the Duchy of Anhalt-Dessau in the first half of the 19th century. He served as the Collector of Customs and Excise for the Duchy and maintained a close relationship with Duke Leopold IV. Raster had a passion for languages (himself being fluent in four) and was noted for translating a number of Lord Byron's works from English into German. He had a friendship with the poet Friedrich von Matthisson, which was said to have a profound effect on his son, Hermann. The elder Raster encouraged his son to study philology and linguistics at the universities in Leipzig and Berlin. Despite his linguistically-oriented education, the younger Raster eventually went into politics and journalism and immigrated to the United States following his participation in the Revolutions of 1848.
