= Kołbacz Abbey =

Monastery in Poland

- Opactwo Cystersów w Kołbaczu
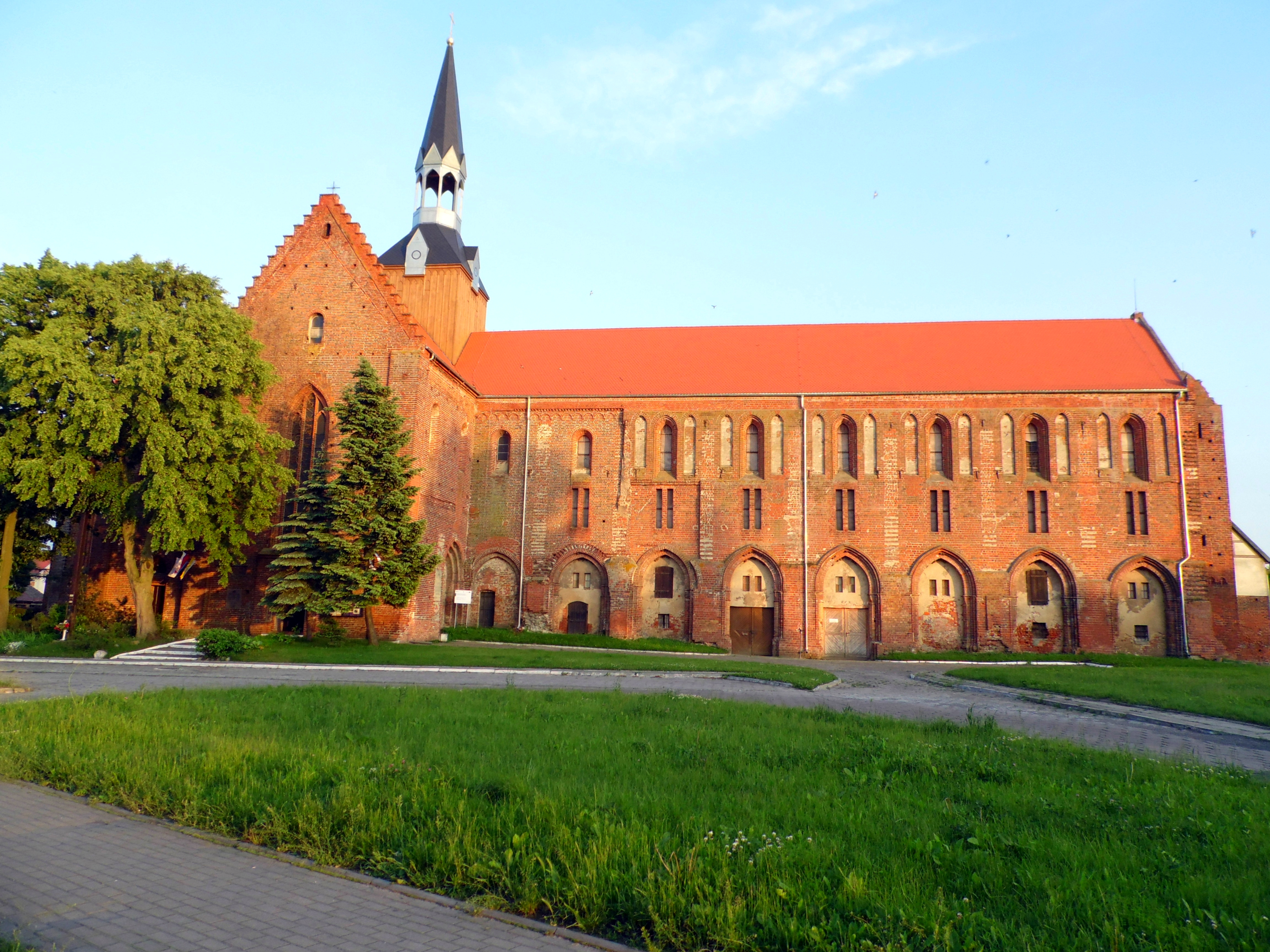
- Sacred Heart church

- Location within Poland

Monastery information
- Order: Cistercians
- Established: 1173
- Disestablished: 1555

Architecture
- Style: Gothic

Site
- Location: Kołbacz
- Country: Poland
- Coordinates: 53°18′05″N 14°48′49″E

Historic Monument of Poland
- Designated: 2014-07-03
- Reference no.: Dz. U. z 2014 r. poz. 955

Kołbacz Abbey is a former Cistercian monastery located in Kołbacz, Poland, listed as a Historic Monument of Poland.

It had several subsidiaries, with the other main centers located in Oliwa, Bierzwnik, and Mironice. It was itself a subsidiary of Clairvaux Abbey in France, although the founding monks originally arrived from Esrum Abbey in Zealand, Denmark.

The abbey was founded in 1173 with the original Latin name "Mera Vallis", but eventually the older Slavic name, Kołbacz became closely associated with the place. The monks were invited into Pomerania by Warcisław II Świętoborzyc, a castellan of Szczecin, as part of an agreement with Valdemar I of Denmark, who had besieged Szczecin and made Warcisław his vassal. The foundation was affirmed by Duke Bogusław I in 1173. The first abbot was Reinhold and the abbey began its activities in 1174.

The wealth of the abbey was based on banking, as much as land ownership.

The abbey played an important role in the development of German settlements in the area, as the first villages of German-speaking inhabitants were founded close to the abbey. Currently it is the site of an agricultural complex which partly houses the Zoological Experimental Institute of the Kraków Technical Institute.

== Gallery ==
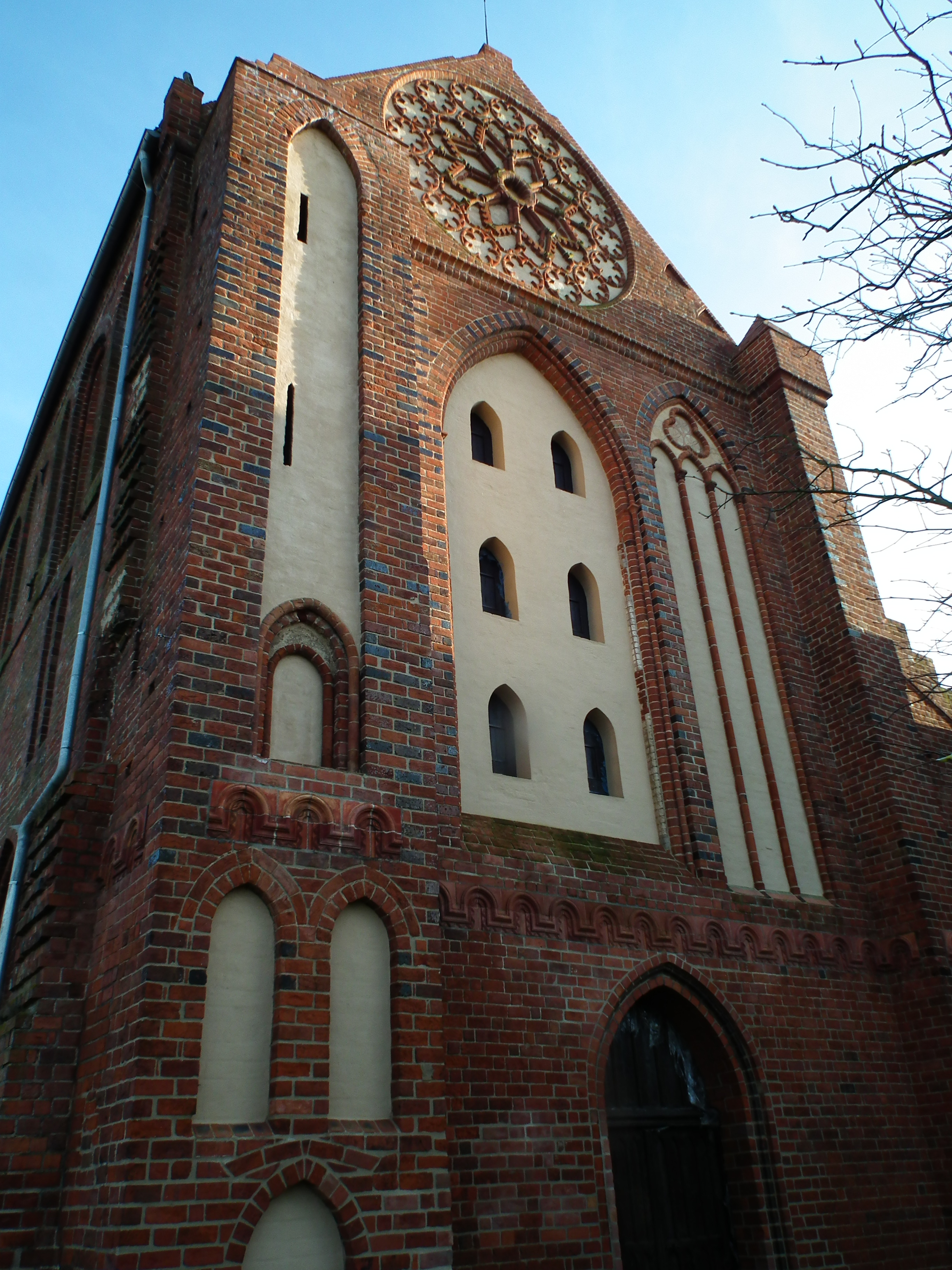
Sacred Heart church

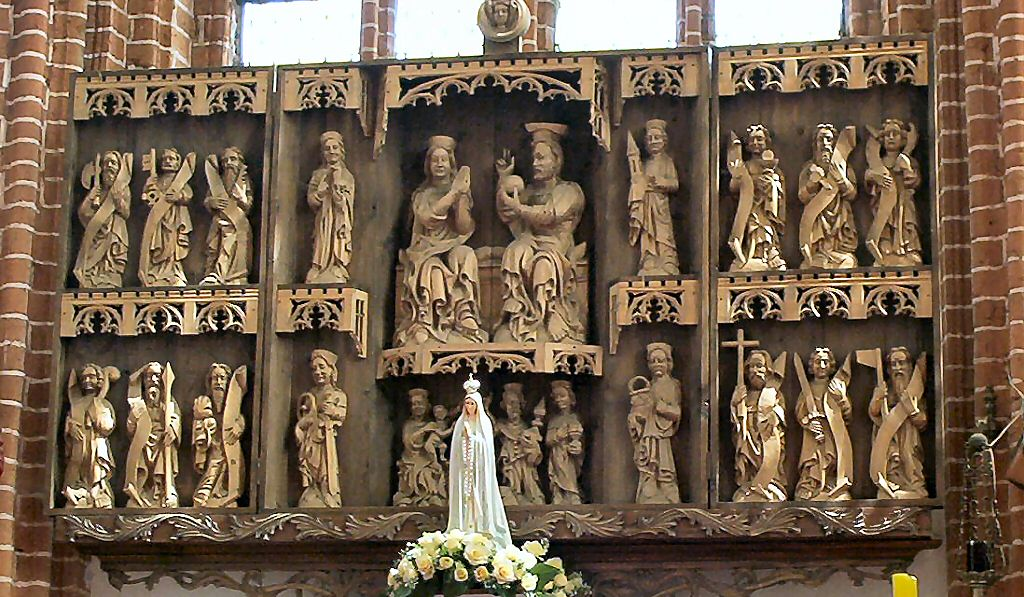
Main altar

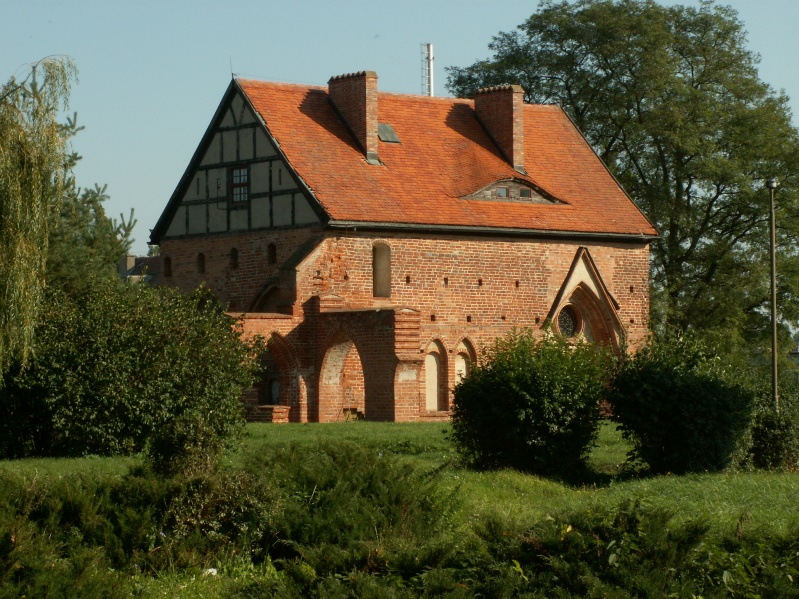
Abbot's House

== See also ==
- List of abbeys and priories in Europe
