= Rybakowo, Lubusz Voivodeship =

Rybakowo
- Village
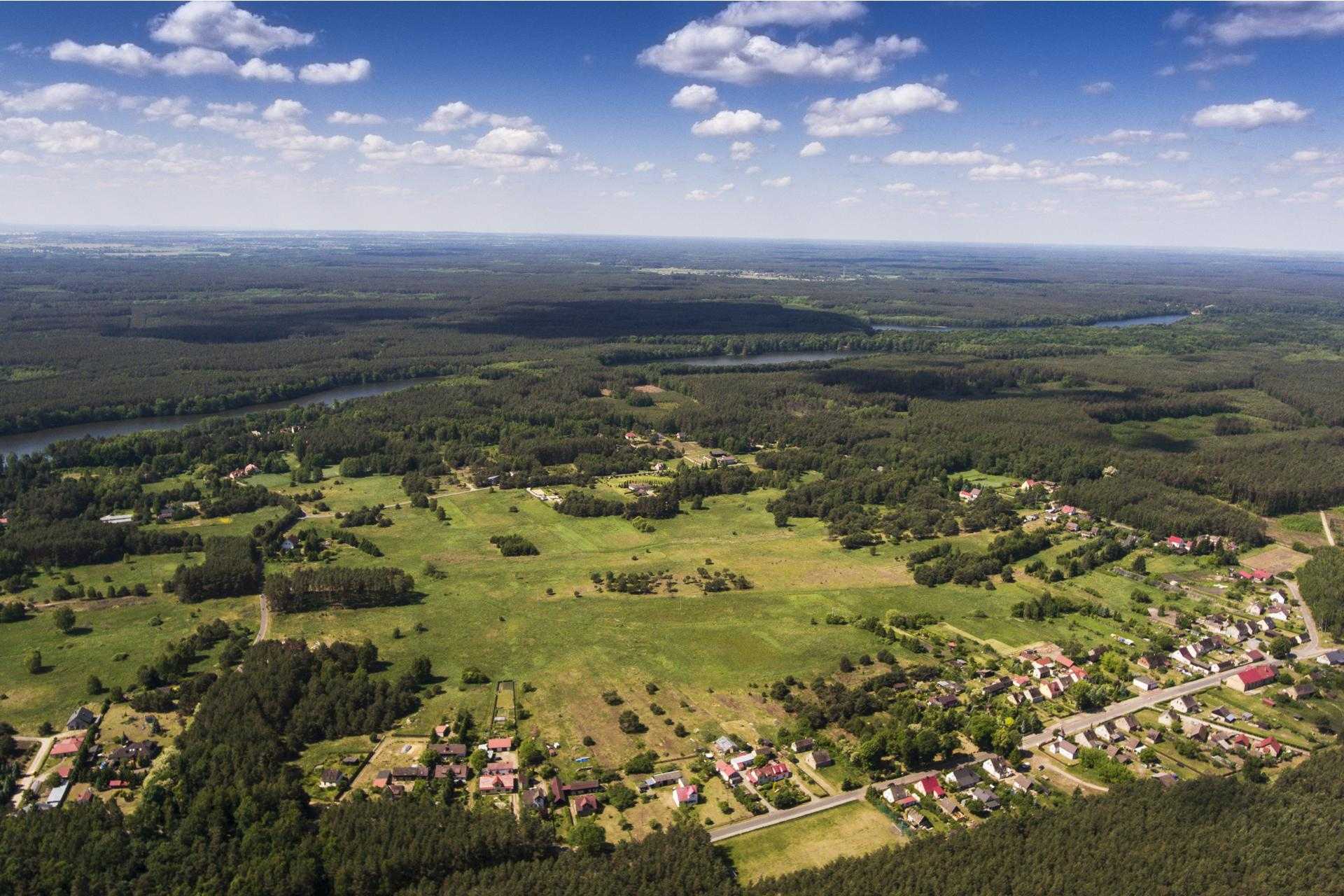

- Location within Poland
- Coordinates: 52°52′N 15°20′E
- Country: Poland
- Voivodeship: Lubusz
- County: Gorzów
- Gmina: Kłodawa
- Time zone: UTC+1 (CET)
  - Summer (DST): UTC+2 (CEST)
- Vehicle registration: FGW

Rybakowo [rɨbaˈkɔvɔ] is a village in the administrative district of Gmina Kłodawa, within Gorzów County, Lubusz Voivodeship, in western Poland.
