= Różanki-Szklarnia =

- Village
- Location within Poland
- Coordinates: 52°46′34″N 15°17′22″E
- Country: Poland
- Voivodeship: Lubusz
- County: Gorzów
- Gmina: Kłodawa

Różanki-Szklarnia [ruˈʐanki ˈʂklarɲa] is a village in the administrative district of Gmina Kłodawa, within Gorzów County, Lubusz Voivodeship, in western Poland.
