= Gmina Kłodawa, Lubusz Voivodeship =

Gmina Kłodawa Kłodawa Commune
- Gmina
- Flag Coat of arms
- Interactive map of Gmina Kłodawa
- Coordinates (Kłodawa): 52°47′29″N 15°12′57″E
- Country: Poland
- Voivodeship: Lubusz
- County: Gorzów
- Seat: Kłodawa

Area
  - Total: 234.72 km^{2} (90.63 sq mi)

Population (2019-06-30)
  - Total: 8,635
  - Density: 36.79/km^{2} (95.28/sq mi)
- Website: https://www.klodawa.pl

Gmina Kłodawa is a rural gmina (administrative district) in Gorzów County, Lubusz Voivodeship, in western Poland. Its seat is the village of Kłodawa, which lies approximately 7 kilometres (4 mi) north of Gorzów Wielkopolski.

The gmina covers an area of 234.83 square kilometres (90.7 sq mi), and as of 2019 its total population is 8,635.

The gmina contains part of the protected area called Barlinek-Gorzów Landscape Park.

== Villages ==
Gmina Kłodawa contains the villages and settlements of Chwalęcice, Kłodawa, Lipy, Łośno, Mironice, Mszaniec, Rębowo, Różanki, Różanki-Szklarnia, Rybakowo, Santocko, Santoczno, Wojcieszyce, Zamoksze and Zdroisko.

== Neighbouring gminas ==
Gmina Kłodawa is bordered by the city of Gorzów Wielkopolski and by the gminas of Barlinek, Lubiszyn, Nowogródek Pomorski, Santok and Strzelce Krajeńskie.

== Twin towns – sister cities ==
Gmina Kłodawa is twinned with:

- Seelow-Land, Germany
