= Letters to a German Princess =

Letters written from Euler to a German princess

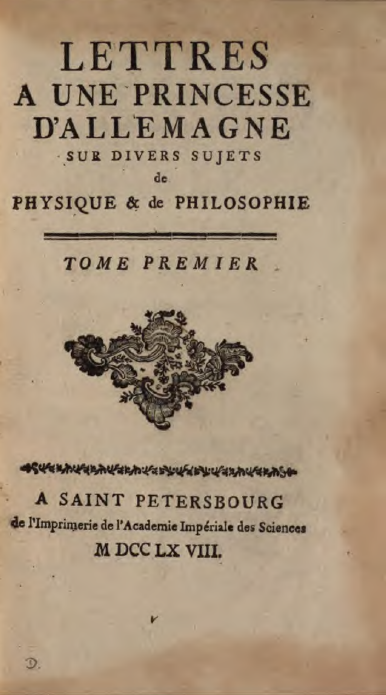
Frontispiece of the first volume, first edition (1768) of Lettres a une princesse d'Allemagne sur divers sujets de physique & de philosophie

Letters to a German Princess, On Different Subjects in Physics and Philosophy (French: Lettres à une princesse d'Allemagne sur divers sujets de physique et de philosophie) were a series of 234 letters written by the mathematician Leonhard Euler between 1760 and 1762 addressed to Friederike Charlotte of Brandenburg-Schwedt and her younger sister Louise.

== Contents ==
Euler started the first letter with an explanation of the concept of "size". Starting with the definition of a foot, he defined the mile and the diameter of the earth as a unit in terms of foot and then calculated the distance of the planets of the Solar System in terms of the diameter of the earth.

== Publication ==
The first two volumes of the 234 letters originally written in French appeared in print in Saint Petersburg in 1768 and the third in Frankfurt in 1774. The letters were later reprinted in Paris with the first volume in 1787, the second in 1788 and the third in 1789.

The publication of the book was supported by Empress Catherine II with her personally writing to Count Vorontsov in January 1766:

I am certain that the academy will be resurrected from its ashes by such an important acquisition, and congratulate myself in advance in having restored this great man to Russia.

— Catherine II, quoted by Bogoliubov et al, Euler and Modern Science

Russian translation of the letters followed in Saint Petersburg by Euler's student Stepan Rumovsky between 1768 and 1774 in 3 volumes.

== Translations ==
The first English translation of the Letters were done by the Scottish minister Henry Hunter in 1795. Hunter targeted the translation at British women, believing that Euler intended to educate women through his work.

The translation of Hunter was based on the 1787 Paris Edition, of Marquis de Condorcet and Sylvestre François Lacroix. The translation differed from the original letters of Euler in its omission of "... the frequent, tiresome, courtly address of YOUR HIGHNESS". The Marquis de Condorcet's translation, made during the Age of Enlightenment, was notable for its omission of Euler's theological references which Condorcet found as "anathema" to teaching science and rationalism.

Translations followed in other languages including Spanish (1798) which differed from the original book by a footnote describing the newly discovered planet Uranus. Subsequent German edition (1847), and French editions (1812 and 1829) were also noted for their reference to Uranus and four minor planets respectively.

== See also ==
- On the Connexion of the Physical Sciences
- Contributions of Leonhard Euler to mathematics

== References and notes ==
Attribution

This article incorporates text from a publication now in the public domain: Lee, Sidney, ed. (1891). "Hunter, Henry". Dictionary of National Biography. Vol. 28. London: Smith, Elder & Co.
