= Lisa Stolzenberg =

American criminologist

- Education: Florida State University
- Scientific career
- Fields: Criminology
- Workplaces: Florida International University, Indiana University – Purdue University Fort Wayne
- Thesis: Unwarranted disparity and determinate sentencing: a longitudinal study of presumptive sentencing guidelines in Minnesota (1993)

Lisa Stolzenberg is an American criminologist. She is a professor in, and chair of, the Department of Criminal Justice at Florida International University (FIU).

== Education and career ==
Stolzenberg attended the University of Florida, where she received her B.S. in criminal justice in 1985. She went on to receive her M.S. and Ph.D. in criminology from Florida State University in 1986 and 1993, respectively. Before joining FIU, she held multiple other positions, including professor of public policy at Indiana University – Purdue University Fort Wayne.
