= Frederick Henry, Margrave of Brandenburg-Schwedt =

Frederick Henry
- Margrave of Brandenburg-Schwedt
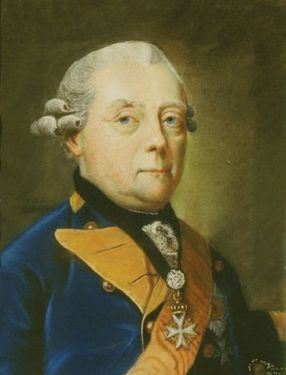
- Born: 21 August 1709; Schwedt
- Died: 12 December 1788 (aged 79); Schwedt
- Spouse: Leopoldine Marie of Anhalt-Dessau
- Issue: Louise of Brandenburg-Schwedt; Friederike Charlotte of Brandenburg-Schwedt
- House: Hohenzollern
- Father: Philip William, Margrave of Brandenburg-Schwedt
- Mother: Princess Johanna Charlotte of Anhalt-Dessau

Frederick Henry, Margrave of Brandenburg-Schwedt (21 August 1709, in Schwedt – 12 December 1788, in Schwedt) was the last owner of the Prussian secundogeniture of Brandenburg-Schwedt.

== Early life ==
His was the son of Margrave Philip William, son of Philip William, Margrave of Brandenburg-Schwedt and his wife Sophia Dorothea of Schleswig-Holstein-Sonderburg-Glücksburg. His mother was Princess Johanna Charlotte of Anhalt-Dessau, daughter of Prince John George II of Anhalt-Dessau and Princess Henriette Catherine of Nassau.

== Life ==
After his father's death in 1711, his mother put Frederick Henry under the guardianship of his uncle Frederick I, and after Frederick I's death in 1713, under the guardianship of his cousin Frederick William I. In 1711, Frederick Henry was made the chief of the Infantry Regiment No. 12. However, he showed little interest in military affairs. In 1733, King Frederick William I was so incensed with the disorder in Frederick Henry's regiment that he was jailed for several weeks. Frederick the Great held little respect for Frederick Henry's abilities and did not employ him. In 1741, Frederick Henry traded the Infantry Regiment No. 12 for the Infantry Regiment No. 42, but again, he cared little for his duties, and he left its business to the respective commanders.

When his brother Frederick William died in 1771, Frederick Henry inherited the Lordship of Schwedt-Wildenbruch. As "Margrave of Brandenburg-Schwedt", he was a patron of the arts, especially theater. In 1755 he acquired the Prinzessinnenpalais in Berlin and in 1785, he contracted the actress Henriette Hendel-Schutz to perform in his Court Theater.

He married his first cousin Leopoldine Marie of Anhalt-Dessau, a daughter of Prince Leopold I of Anhalt-Dessau, nicknamed the old Dessauer. After the birth of two daughters, he and his wife quarreled so often and so violently that he banned her to Kolberg for the rest of her life.

Between 1760 and 1762, the mathematician Leonhard Euler sent numerous letters in French about mathematical and philosophical subjects to his daughter Frederike. These letters were published between 1769 and 1773 under the title "Letters to a German Princess" and were printed in Leipzig and St. Petersburg. The French edition alone enjoyed 12 printings. It was the Age of Enlightenment and Euler tried to explain physical issues and in particular their philosophical background in a generally understandable manner. Frederick Henry may have employed Euler as her teacher.

When he died in 1788, the junior line of Brandenburg-Schwedt died out and the secundogeniture fell back to the Electorate. His daughters and nieces received a pension.

== Daughters ==
- Louise of Brandenburg-Schwedt (10 August 1750 – 21 December 1811) married Prince (later Duke) Leopold III of Anhalt-Dessau (1740–1817)
- Friederike Charlotte of Brandenburg-Schwedt (18 August 1745 – 23 January 1808), the last Abbess of Herford Abbey
