= Princess Louise of Brandenburg-Schwedt =

Louise of Brandenburg-Schwedt
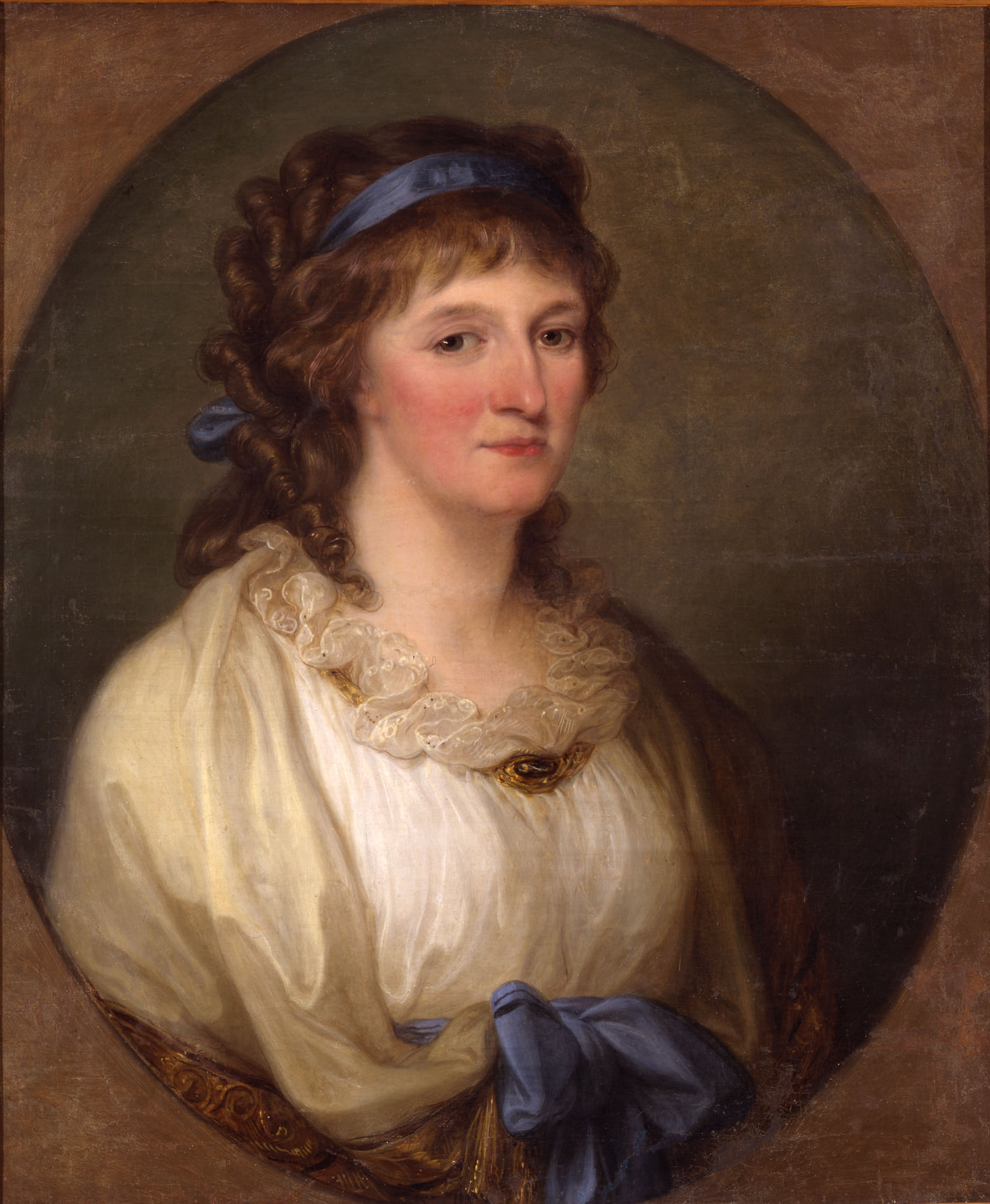
- Louise of Brandenburg-Schwedt in a painting by Angelica Kauffman, 1798

Princess, then Duchess of Anhalt-Dessau
- Tenure: 25 July 1767 – 21 December 1811
- Born: 24 September 1750; Różanki
- Died: 21 December 1811 (aged 61); Dessau
- Spouse: Leopold III, Prince of Anhalt-Dessau
- Issue: Frederick, Hereditary Prince of Anhalt-Dessau
- House: Hohenzollern
- Father: Frederick Henry, Margrave of Brandenburg-Schwedt
- Mother: Leopoldine Marie of Anhalt-Dessau

Louise Henriette Wilhelmine of Brandenburg-Schwedt (24 September 1750 in Różanki – 21 December 1811 in Dessau), was a Margravine of Brandenburg by birth and by marriage a princess, and later Duchess, of Anhalt-Dessau.

== Early life ==
Louise was the daughter of Margrave Frederick Henry, Margrave of Brandenburg-Schwedt and his wife, Princess Leopoldine Marie of Anhalt-Dessau. By birth, Louise Henriette belonged to Brandenburg-Schwedt line of the House of Hohenzollern.

== Biography ==
She was educated in Prussia, together with her sister, Friederike Charlotte of Brandenburg-Schwedt. Between 1760 and 1762, the mathematician Leonhard Euler sent her sister numerous letters in French about mathematical and philosophical subjects. These letters were published between 1769 and 1773 under the title Letters to a German Princess and were printed in Leipzig and St. Petersburg. The French edition was printed twelve times. She befriended Jenny Voigts who was a life-long friend of Louise's.

She was considered educated and well-read and was artistically gifted and was friends with famous artists, among them Angelica Kauffman, who painted some portraits of Louise. She traveled to England in 1775, and later to Switzerland and Italy.

== Marriage and issue ==
She married her cousin Leopold III, Prince of Anhalt-Dessau on 25 July 1767 in Charlottenburg. By this marriage, she was Princess, and later Duchess, of Anhalt-Desau. Together, they had:

1. A stillborn daughter (b. and d. Dessau, 11 February 1768).
2. Frederick, Hereditary Prince of Anhalt-Dessau (b. Dessau, 27 December 1769 – d. Dessau, 27 May 1814).
