= Princess Leopoldine Marie of Anhalt-Dessau =

Princess of Anhalt-Dessau (1716–1782)

Leopoldine Marie of Anhalt-Dessau
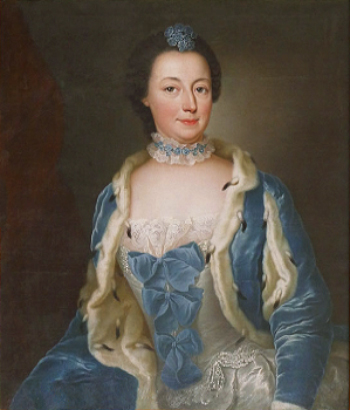
- Portrait c. 1740–1760
- Born: 12 December 1716; Dessau, Anhalt-Dessau, Holy Roman Empire (now Germany)
- Died: 27 January 1782 (aged 65); Kołobrzeg, Prussia, Holy Roman Empire (now Poland)
- Spouse: Frederick Henry, Margrave of Brandenburg-Schwedt
- Issue: Louise of Brandenburg-Schwedt; Friederike Charlotte of Brandenburg-Schwedt
- House: Ascania
- Father: Leopold I, Prince of Anhalt-Dessau
- Mother: Anna Louise Föhse

Leopoldine Marie, Princess of Anhalt-Dessau (12 December 1716 – 27 January 1782) was Princess of Anhalt-Dessau by birth and Margravine of Brandenburg-Schwedt by virtue of marriage.

== Early life ==
She was born in Oranienbaum palace as the fourth daughter and ninth child of Prince Leopold I, Prince of Anhalt-Dessau and his initially morganatic wife, Anna Louise Föhse.

== Life ==
After the death of her husband in 1788, Margraviate of Brandenburg-Schwedt was incorporated into the Kingdom of Prussia. Since then, her former home, Schwedt palace was used by the Prussian royal family as their summer residence.

== Marriage and issue ==
She married on 13 February 1739 Frederick Henry, Margrave of Brandenburg-Schwedt, who became the last Margrave. They had two daughters:

- Louise (10 August 1750 – 20 December 1811), who married her cousin, Prince Leopold III of Anhalt-Dessau (10 August 1740 – 9 August 1817).
- Friederike Charlotte (18 August 1745 – 23 January 1808), the last Abbess of Herford Abbey.

== Death ==
She died in Kolberg on 27 January 1782 at the age of 65.
