= Emil Hirsch =

Emil Hirsch may refer to:

- Emil G. Hirsch, Luxembourgish-born Jewish American biblical scholar and rabbi
- Emil Hirsch (antiquarian), German antiquarian bookseller

== See also ==
- Emile Hirsch, American actor
- Emile Hirsch (painter), French stained glass artist
