= Eugénie Latil =

French painter and sculptor

- Born: Eugénie Victoire Joséphine Henry c. 1798; Moscow, Russia
- Died: September 29, 1879; Saint-Girons, Ariège, France
- Movement: Romanticism
- Spouse: François Vincent Mathieu Latil (m. 1833)

Eugénie Latil (born Eugénie Victoire Joséphine Henry; Moscow, c. 1798 – Saint-Girons, 29 September 1879) was a French painter and sculptor. She exhibited at the Paris Salon from 1822 and received medals in 1839 and 1841. Her works are held in several French public collections, including the Musée Massey in Tarbes, the Musée de Grenoble, and the Maison de Victor Hugo in Paris.

== Life ==
Eugénie Henry was born in Moscow to French parents. Her death certificate, held at the Archives départementales de l'Ariège, gives her age at death as 81, placing her birth around 1798. 19th-century biographical dictionaries give the year 1808.

She exhibited at the Paris Salon for the first time in 1822 under the name Mlle Henry.

In 1833, she married the painter François Vincent Latil (1796–1890). From 1842 onward she exhibited at the Salon under the name Mme Latil, née Henry.

In 1860, the couple left Paris and settled in Saint-Girons in the Ariège department, supported by an annuity, a pension from the Ministry of Fine Arts, and a life insurance policy. Having no direct heirs, they sought a recipient for their art collection. The town of Saint-Girons declined the gift for financial reasons.

In 1878, the Latils offered the collection to Tarbes, having learned of the bequest that Placide Massey had made to that city. A total of 108 works were transferred to what is now the Musée Massey, including 27 paintings and 24 sculptures by Eugénie Latil.

Eugénie Latil died in Saint-Girons on 29 September 1879. Her husband died on 4 March 1890.

== Work ==
Latil painted portraits, genre scenes, and history subjects drawn from literature and religious tradition. Her sculpture was produced in plaster and includes portraits, relief panels, and religious subjects.

She exhibited at the Paris Salon from 1822 to at least 1857, receiving a medal in 1839 and another in 1841. A painting depicting Quasimodo saving Esmeralda, inspired by Victor Hugo's Notre-Dame de Paris, was shown at the Salon of 1833. It is now held at the Maison de Victor Hugo in Paris, measuring 81 × 65 cm, signed "Miss Henry 1832".

Works reproduced from her Salon paintings appeared in the Journal des artistes in 1839, 1840, and 1841.

== Collections ==
Works by Eugénie Latil are held in the following public collections:

- Musée Massey, Tarbes — 27 paintings and 24 sculptures, donated by the Latils in 1878
- Musée de Grenoble — Travail et paresse, oil on canvas, 55 × 46 cm, donated by the artist in 1840
- Musée Granet, Aix-en-Provence — Jeune paysanne endormie, oil on panel, 20 × 16 cm, donated by the artist in 1869
- Maison de Victor Hugo, Paris — Quasimodo sauvant la Esmeralda des mains de ses bourreaux, 1832
- Musée d'Orsay — catalogued in the artist register
- Château-musée Henri IV, Nérac — Les Adieux d'Henri IV à Gabrielle d'Estrées, 1842, on deposit from Musée Massey
- Église Saint-Philippe-du-Roule, Paris — Le Vœu de Saint Louis
