= Kœtzingue =

Commune in Grand Est, France

Kœtzingue Ketzige
- Commune
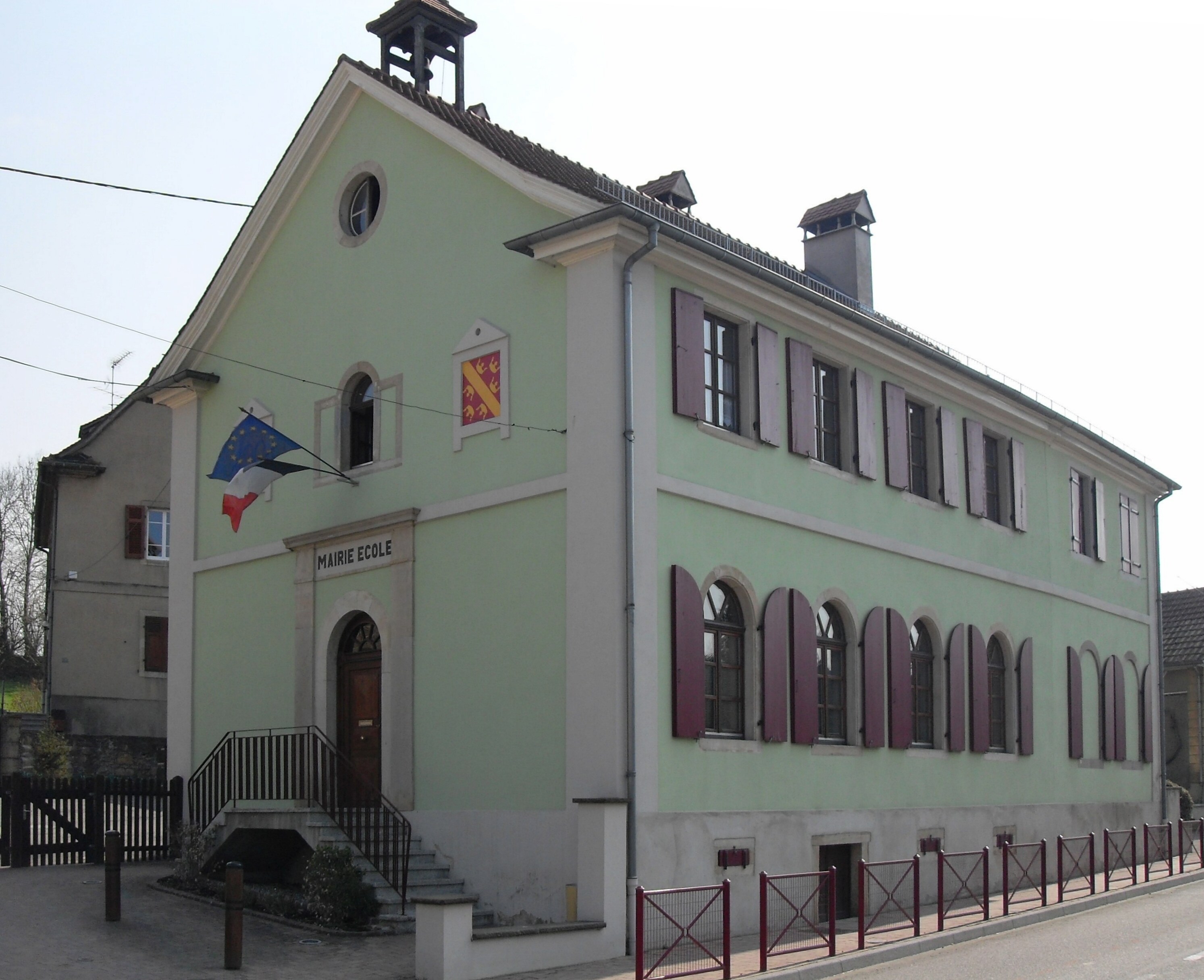
- The town hall and school in Kœtzingue

- Coat of arms
- Location of Kœtzingue
- Location within France Location within Grand Est
- Coordinates: 47°39′04″N 7°23′35″E
- Country: France
- Region: Grand Est
- Department: Haut-Rhin
- Arrondissement: Mulhouse
- Canton: Brunstatt-Didenheim
- Intercommunality: Saint-Louis Agglomération

Government
  - Mayor (2020–2026): Laurent Sutter
- Area^{1}: 5.14 km^{2} (1.98 sq mi)
- Elevation: 296 m (971 ft)
- Highest elevation: 370 m (1,210 ft)
- Lowest elevation: 281 m (922 ft)
- Population (2023): 585
  - Density: 114/km^{2} (295/sq mi)
- Time zone: UTC+01:00 (CET)
  - Summer (DST): UTC+02:00 (CEST)
- INSEE/Postal code: 68170 /68510
- ^{1} French Land Register data, which excludes lakes, ponds, glaciers > 1 km^{2} (0.386 sq mi or 247 acres) and river estuaries.

Kœtzingue (French pronunciation: [kœtsɛ̃ɡ]; Alemannic German: Ketzige; German: Kötzingen) is a commune in the Haut-Rhin department in Alsace in north-eastern France.

The composer and organist Alphonse Schmitt (1875–1912) was born in Kœtzingue.

== See also ==
- Communes of the Haut-Rhin département
