= Église Saint-Philippe-du-Roule =

Coordinates: 48°52′24″N 2°18′38″E

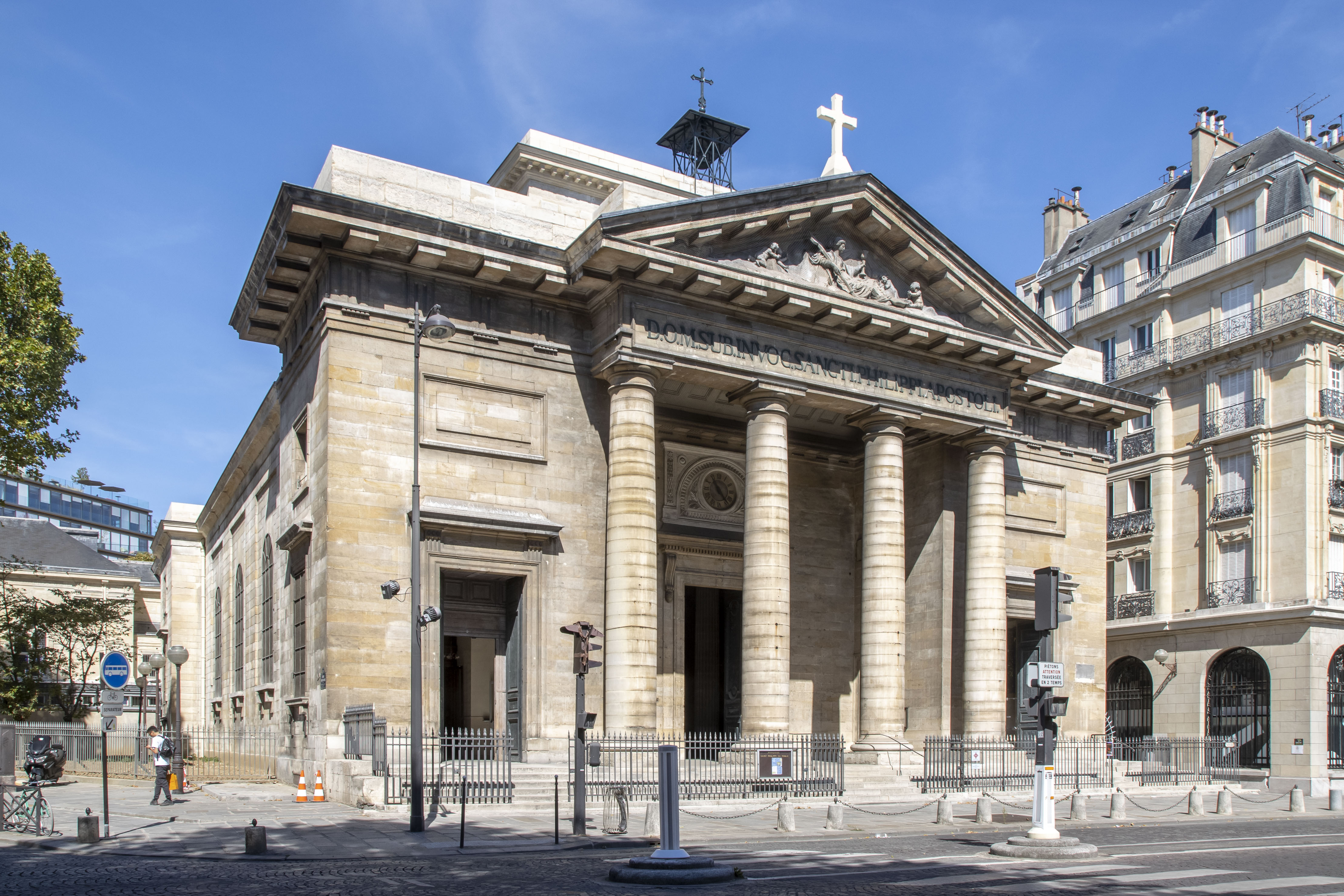
- Facade
- Église Saint-Philippe-du-Roule
- Location: 154 Rue de Faubourg-Saint-Honoré, 75008 Paris
- Country: France
- Denomination: Roman Catholic
- Website: https://saintphilippeduroule.fr

Architecture
- Heritage designation: Monument historique
- Designated: 1993
- Architect(s): Jean-François Chalgrin, Etienne-Hippolyte Godde, Victor Baltard

The Église Saint-Philippe-du-Roule is a Roman Catholic church located at 154 Rue du Faubourg-Saint-Honoré in the 8th arrondissement of Paris. Resembling a Roman temple. it was built in the style of Neoclassicism between 1774 and 1784 by architect Jean-François Chalgrin, best known for his design of the Arc de Triomphe. It was enlarged in 1845 by the architects Étienne-Hippolyte Godde and Victor Baltard.

== History ==
The predecessor of the church was a small chapel attached to a hospital for leprosy, which was demolished in 1739. It was located in the village of Roule, which had been joined to Paris in 1722, and was becoming a fashionable residential neighborhood. King Louis XV wished to give the community a suitable church. The architect Jean-François Chalgrin, who later became famous for his plan for the Arc de Triomphe, was chosen for the project. Chalgrin made a design in the neoclassical style, very popular in the period, with a facade resembling a Roman temple. Construction lasted from 1774 until 1784. Chalgrin's original plan called for two bell towers, but these were dropped because of a shortage of funds.

During the French Revolution the church was closed, but the building was returned to the church in 1792, and became the parish church once again in 1802. The population of the neighborhood continued to grow, and an enlargement of the church was needed. Beginning in 1845 the architect Etienne-Hippolyte Godde (1781–1869) added a disambulatory with classical columns and a new chapel behind the altar in the west end of the church. This plan, based on the early Paleochristian churches in Rome, became very popular during the French Restoration. They added a lavishly decorated axial chapel, dedicated to the Virgin Mary, at the east end of the church.

Later in the 19th century, colorful stained glass windows depicting events in the lives of Saint Philip and Saint John, were added along the side aisles; these were the work of Emile Hirsch (1832–1904).

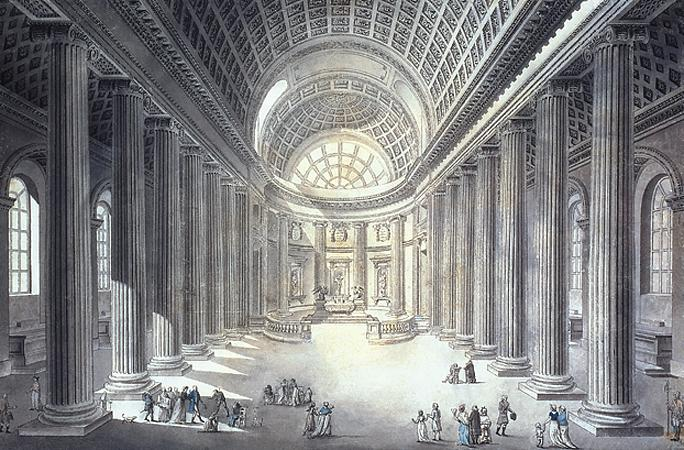
The church interior in about 1785

== Exterior ==
The exterior of the church is modelled after the early Christian basilicas in Rome, The peristyle over the portal is supported by four columns of the Doric order, and is topped by a triangular pediment. The sculpture on the pediment is decorated with an allegorical figure representing Religion, holding a chalice and a cross. The sculpture was made by Francois-Joseph Duret (1732–1816). The inscription below says that the church is dedicated to Saint Philip the Apostle.

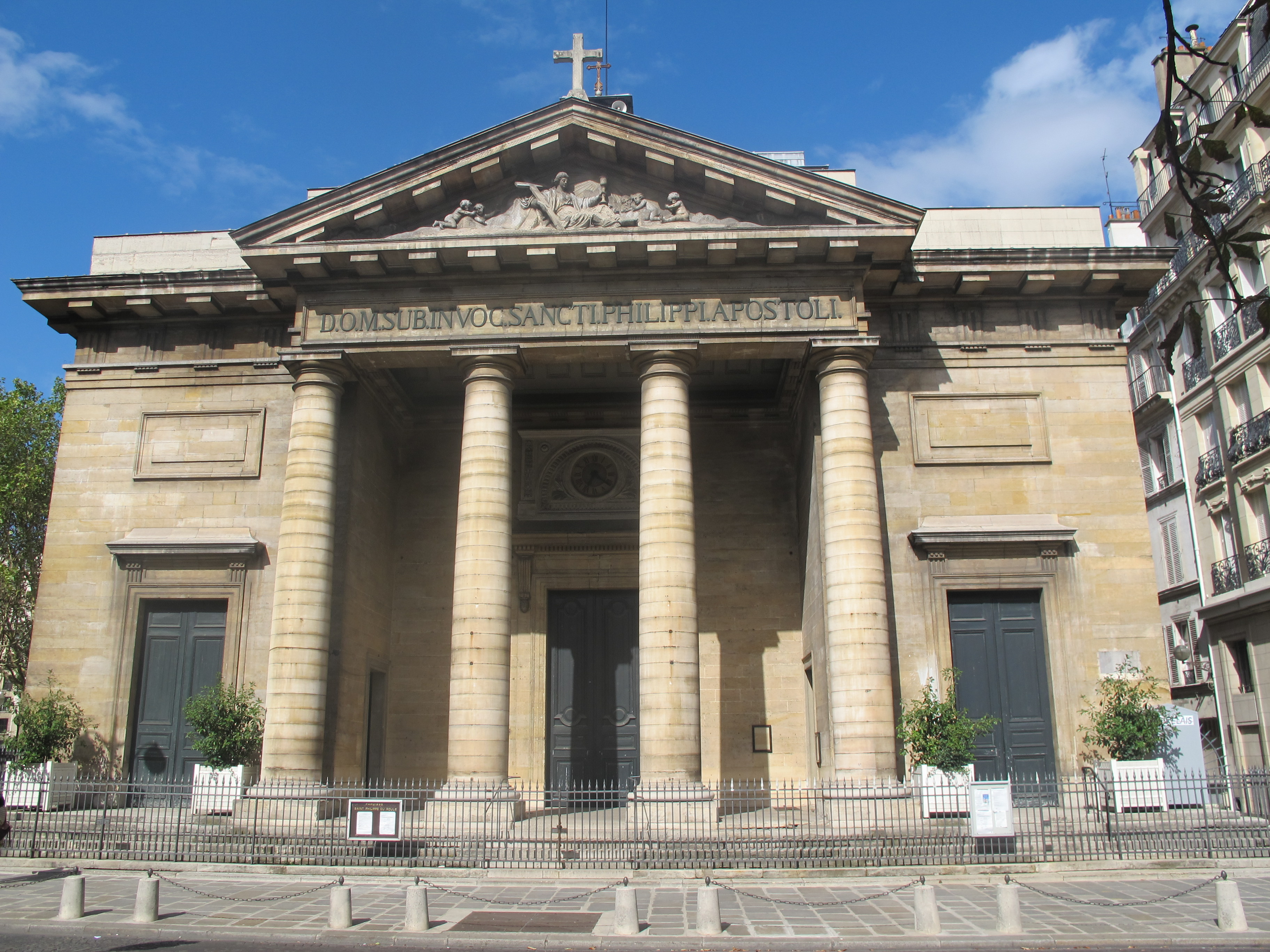
The facade of the church, with four columns of the Doric order supporting the peristyle

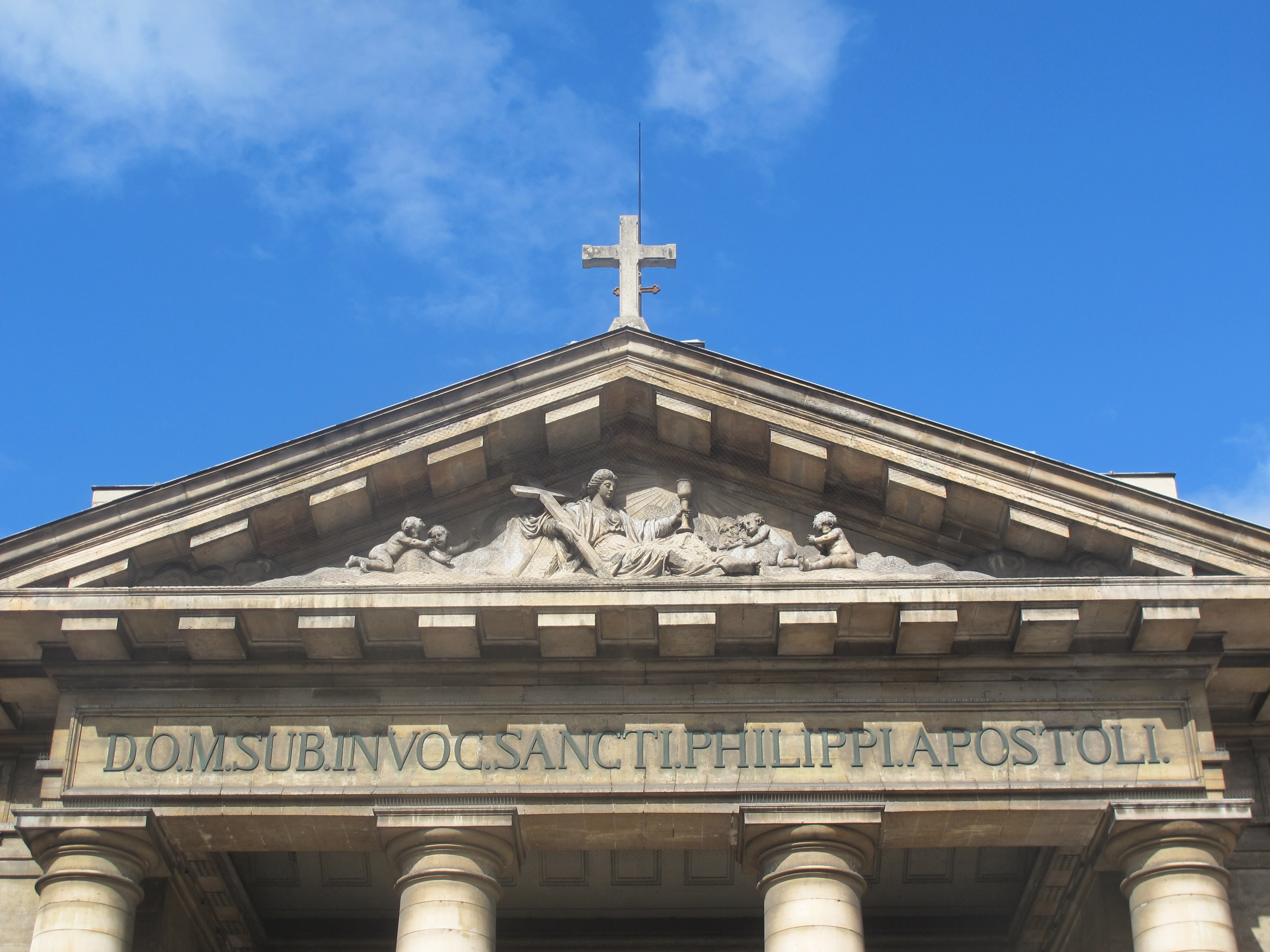
The sculpture on the pediment depicts "Religion", holding a chalice and a cross.

== Nave and choir ==
The nave and choir are ringed by columns with capitals of the Ionic order, giving it a formal appearance, but this is offset by the colorful and dramatic art in the room. The caissons of the rounded ceiling, decorated with floral elements, are actually wood painted to resemble stone."

In the rotunda above the choir is the centerpiece of the art in the church, a painting by Theodore Chassériau (1819-1856), dramatically depicting The descent of Christ from the Cross. The body of Christ is held up by mourners, who include the Virgin Mary in a central position, and an assembly of Saints. The colors of the painting and dramatic positions of the mourners provide a striking contrast to the formal classical architecture around them.

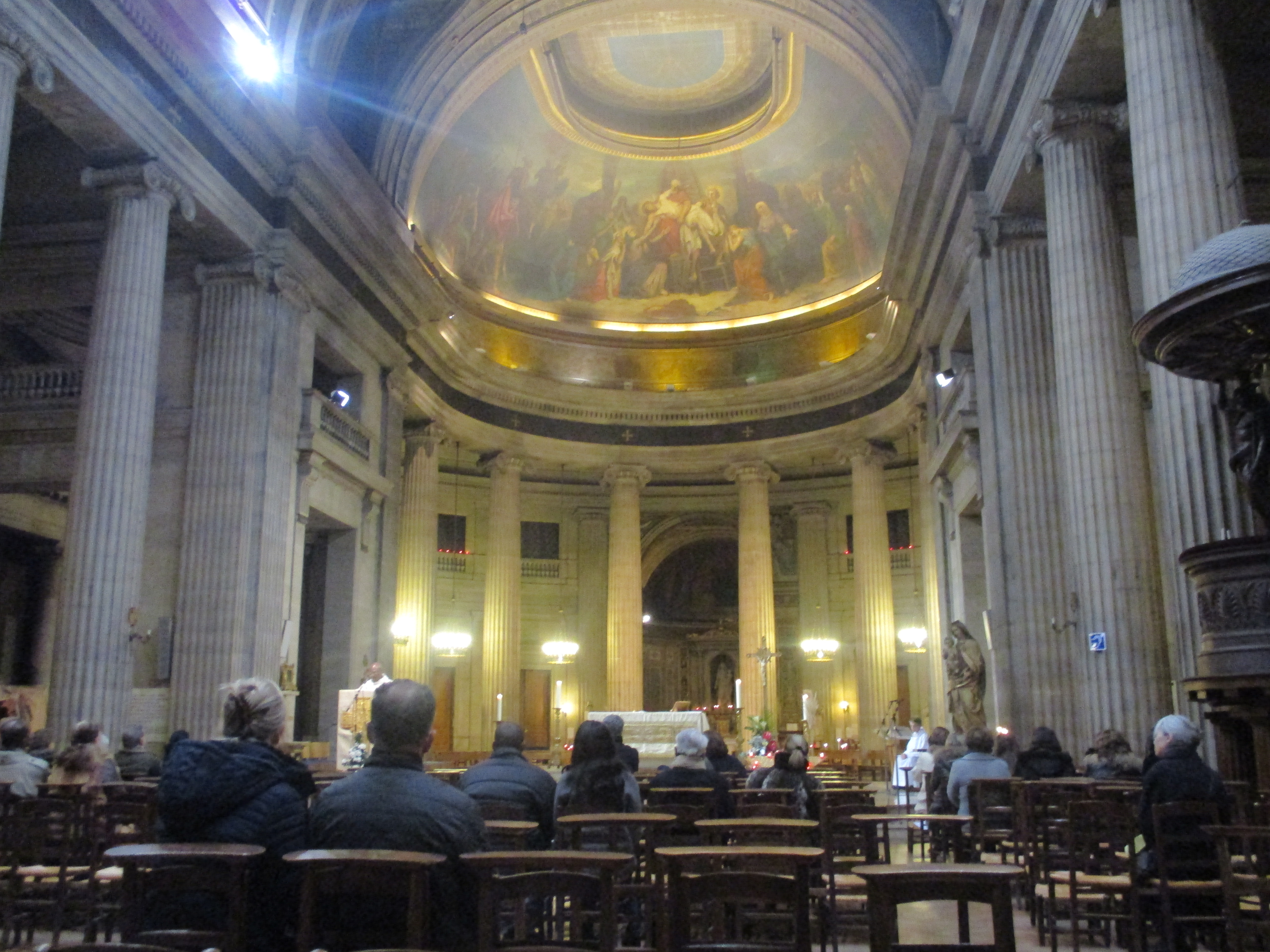
The nave, looking toward the choir

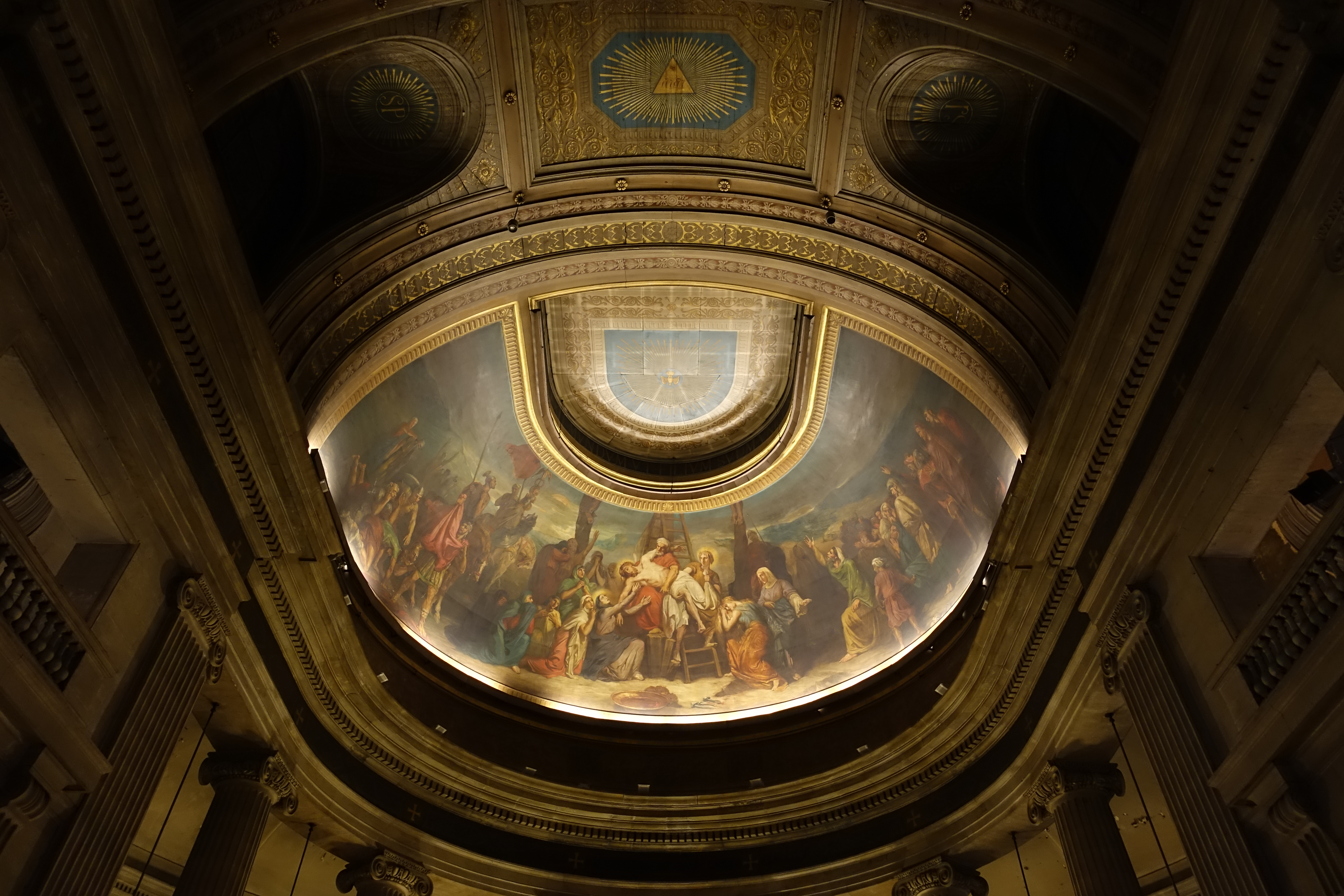
"Descent from the Cross" by Theodore Chassériau

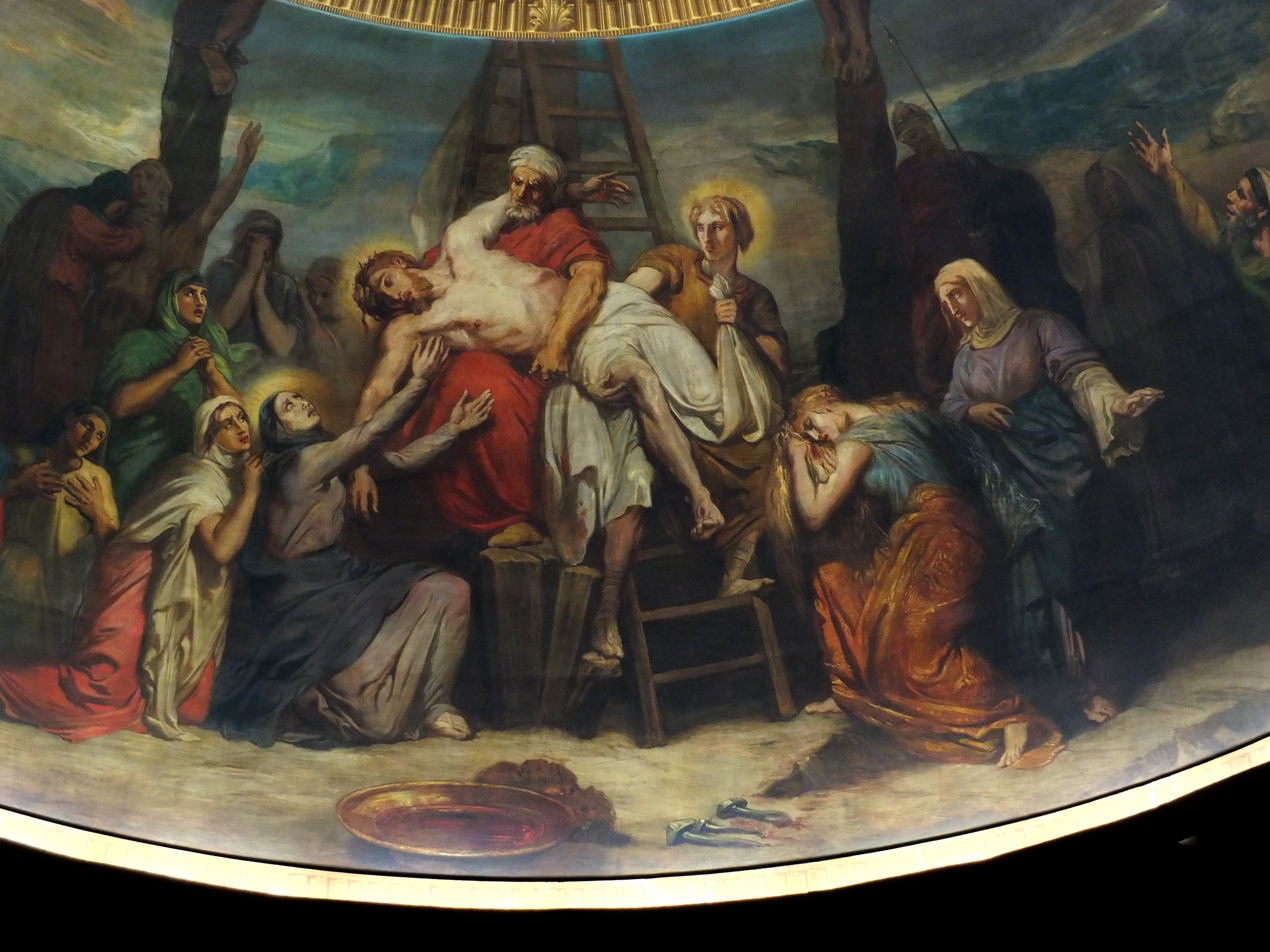
Detail of "The Descent from the Cross"

== Chapel of the Virgin ==
The Chapel of the Virgin, behind the altar in the apse of the church, is the most highly decorated part of the church, with sculpture and paintings illustrating the life of the Virgin Mary. The lower row of paintings of Claudius Jacquand (1804–1878) show scenes from the life of the Virgin, while the upper paintings illustrate the litanies. The painting by Jacquand in the vault over the altar depicts Christ crowning the Virgin. Christ is accompanied by Saint Philip and Saint John.

The centerpiece of the chapel is a marble statue of the Virgin Mary and child, called "Our Lady of All the Graces", by Charles-François Lebœuf Nanteuil (1792–1865).

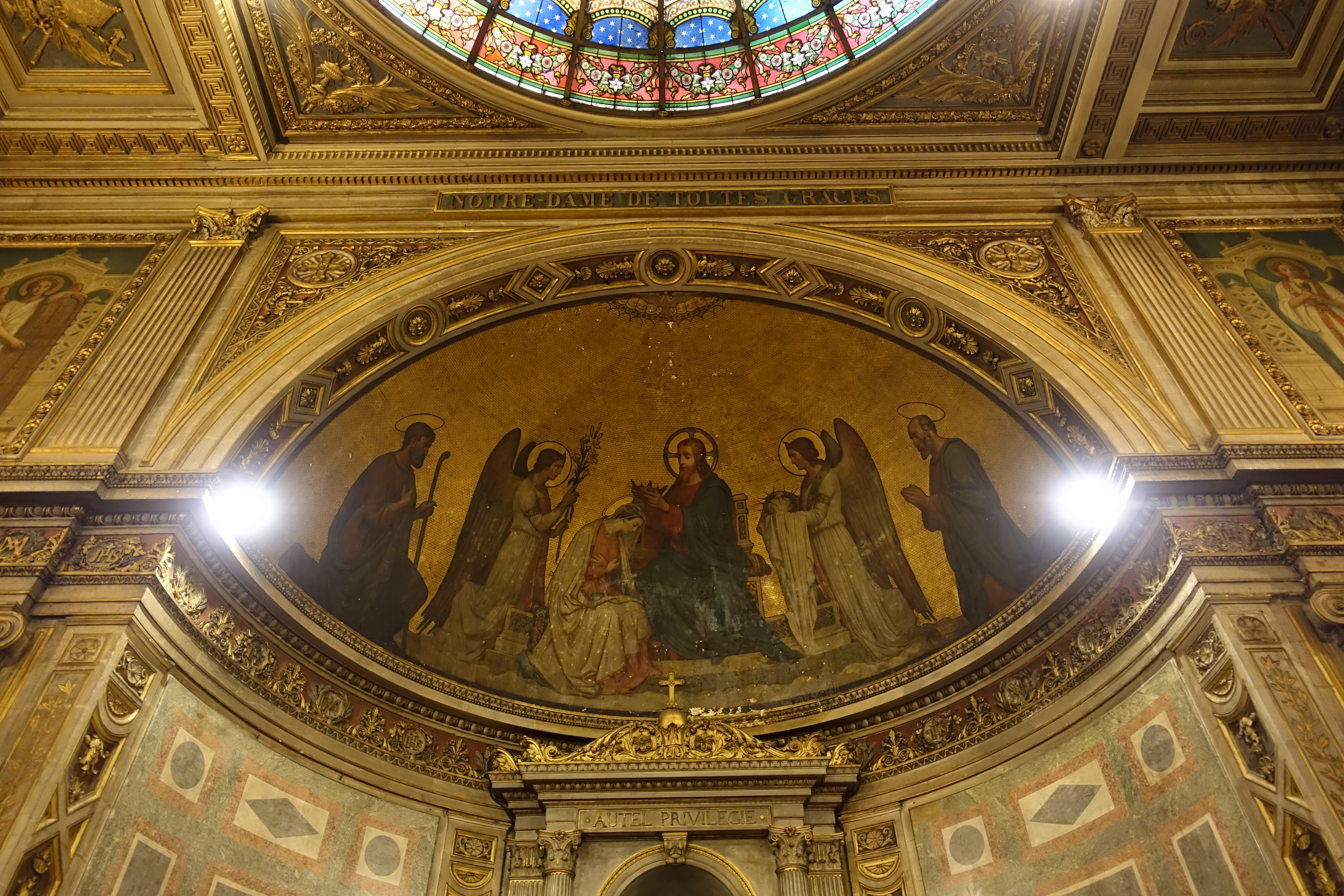
Painting over the altar in the Chapel of the Virgin; "Christ crowning the Virgin" by Claudius Jacquand

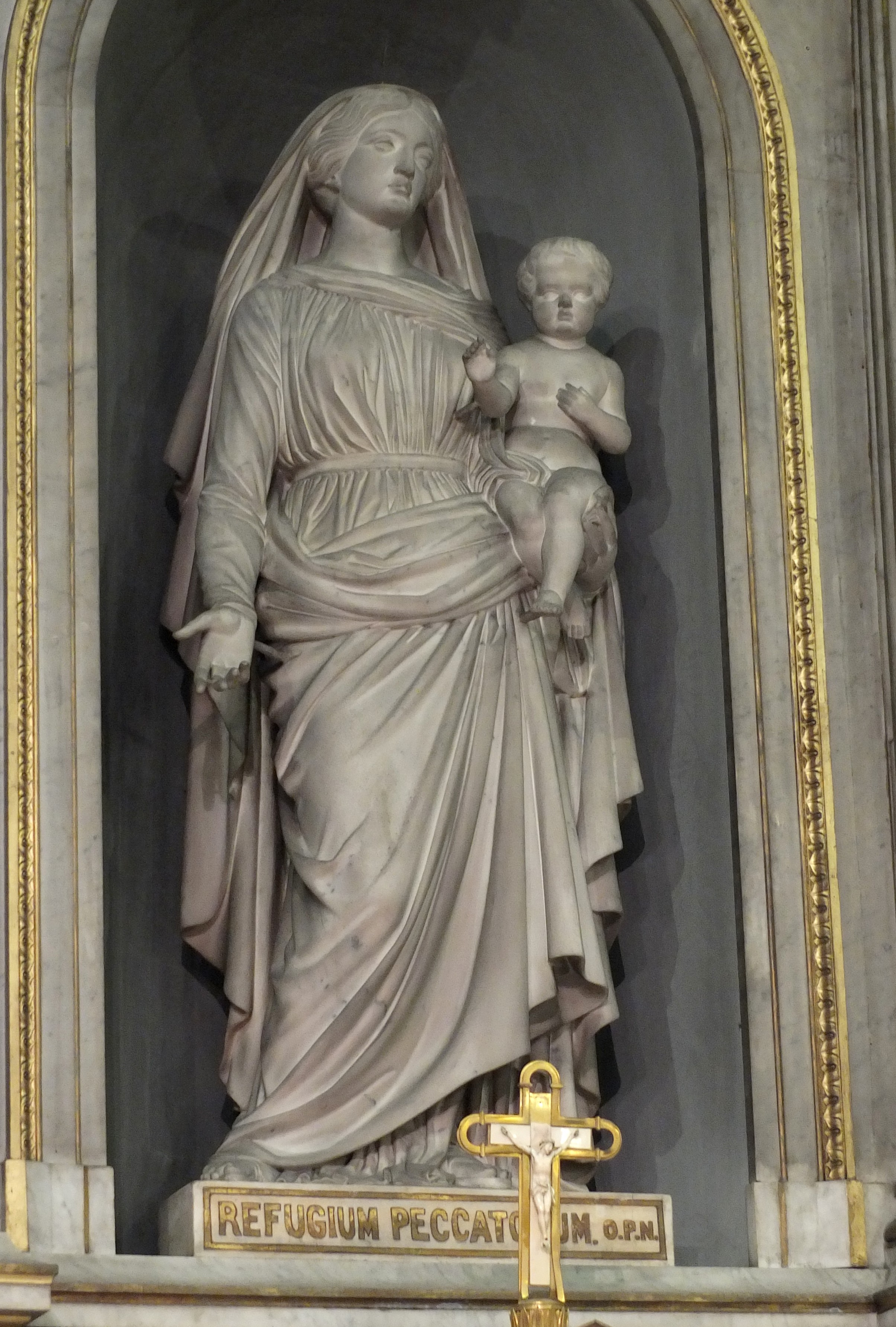
Statue of Virgin Mary in the Chapel of the Virgin

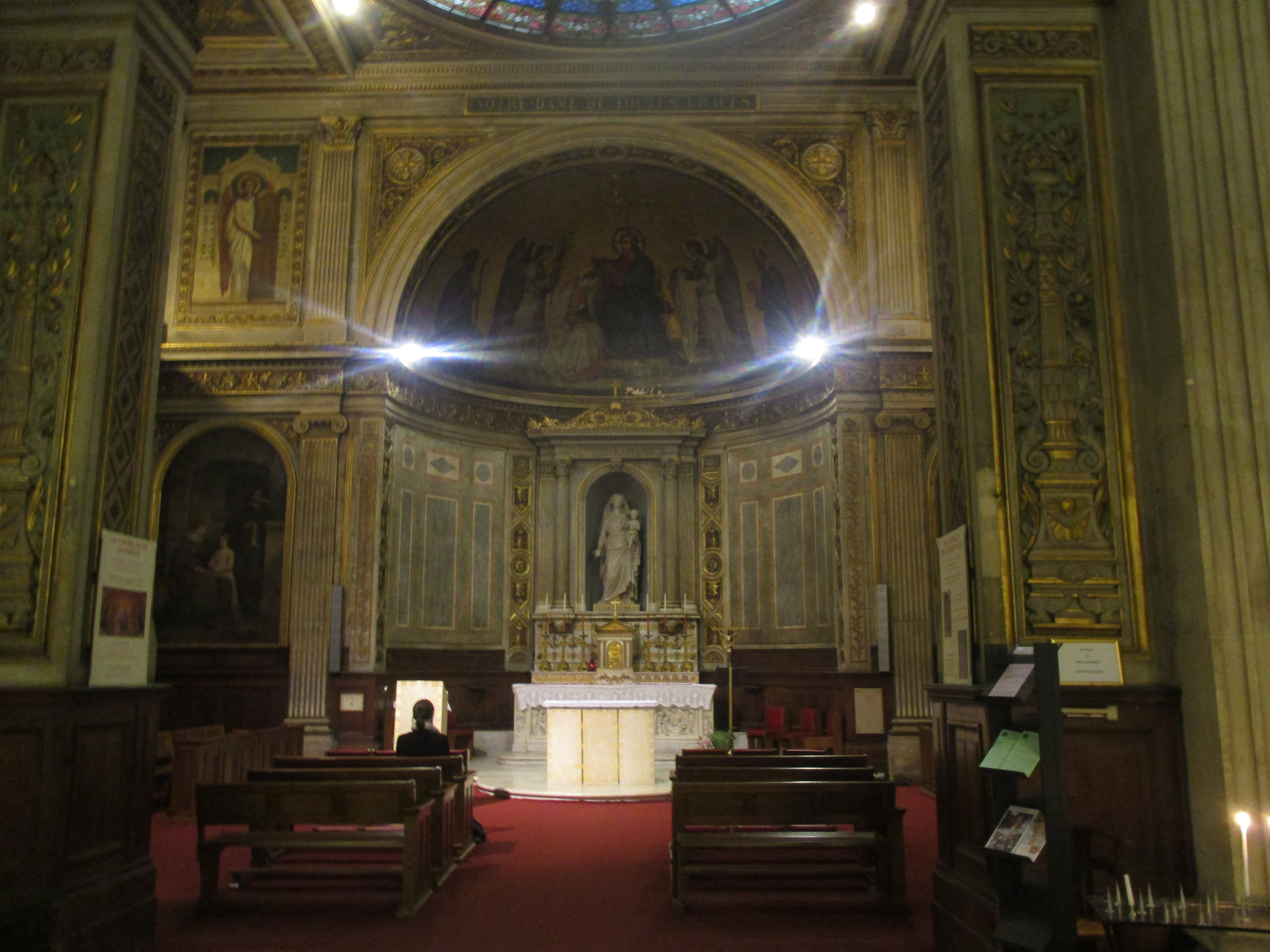
Altar of the Chapel of the Virgin
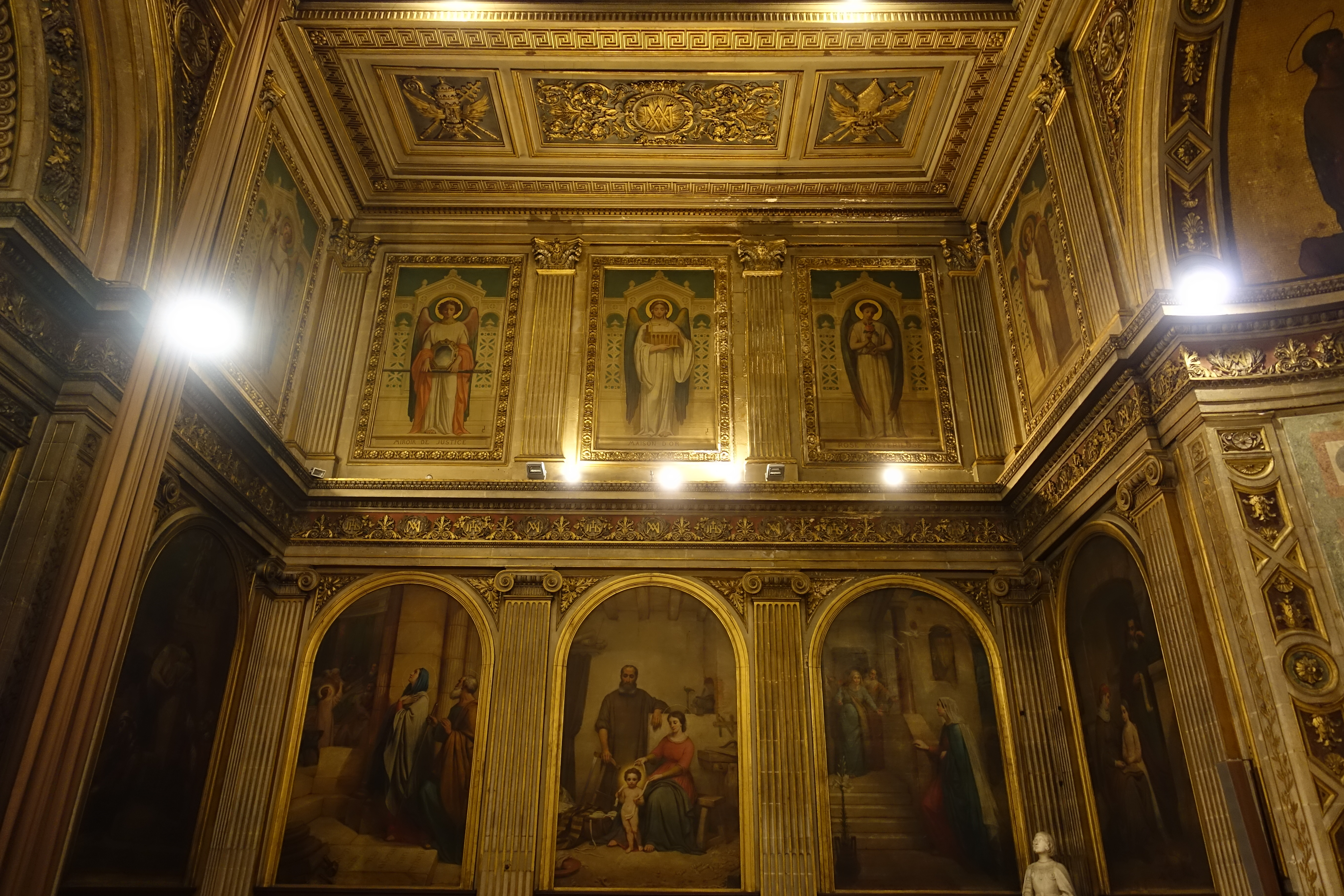
Chapel of the Virgin

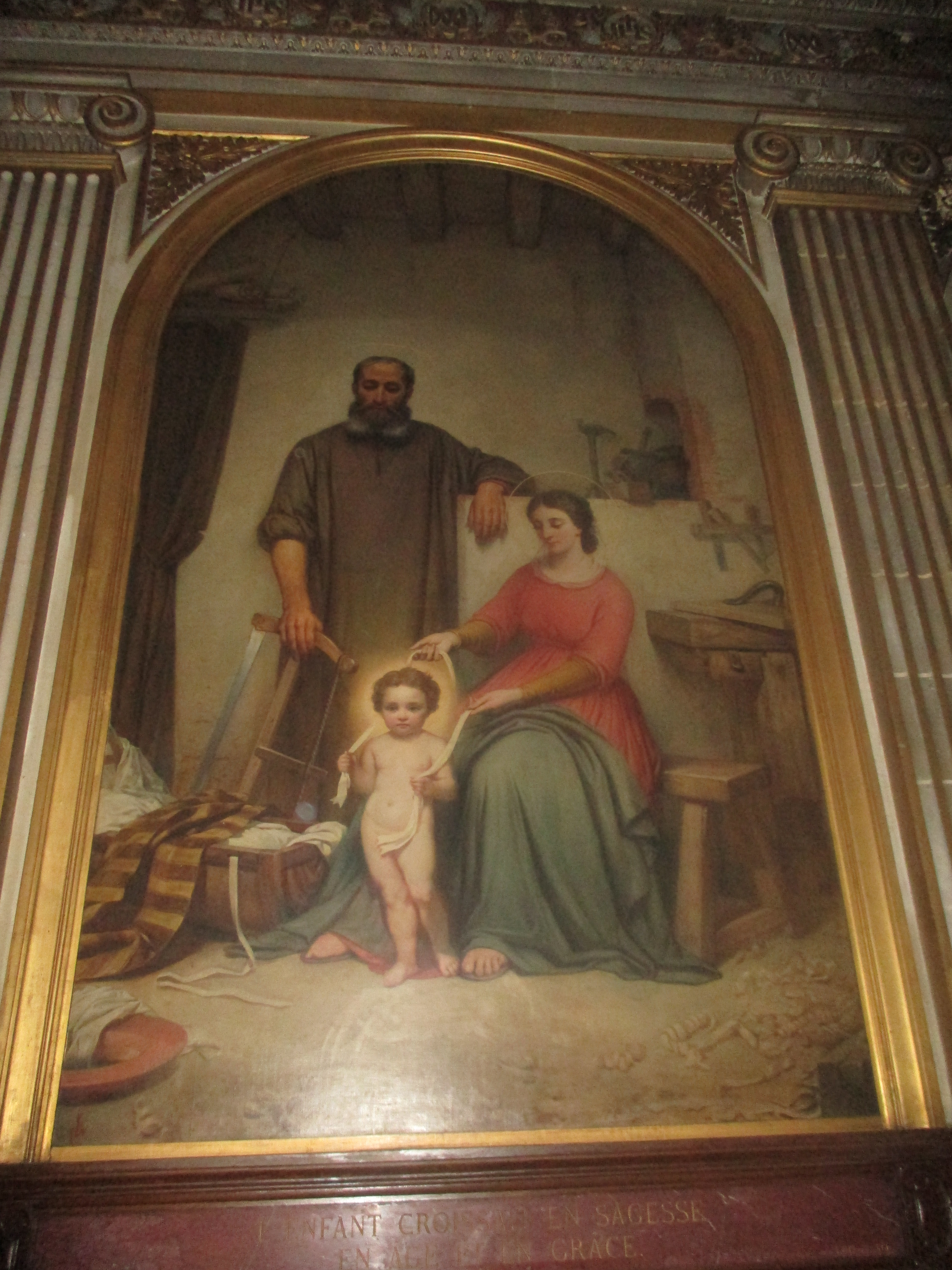
Painting of the Holy Family by Claudius Jacquand

== Stained glass ==
The bays along the outer outer aisles are not occupied by chapels, and instead are filled with colorful stained glass windows in the Art Nouveau style from the end of the 19th century. The windows in the aisles illustrate scenes from the lives of Saint Philip the Apostle and Saint John the Apostle. These were made by Emile Hirsch (1832–1904). A series of windows depicting saints was created from paintings by Albert Maignan in 1894. A colorful circular stained glass is placed over the altar in the Chapel of the Virgin.

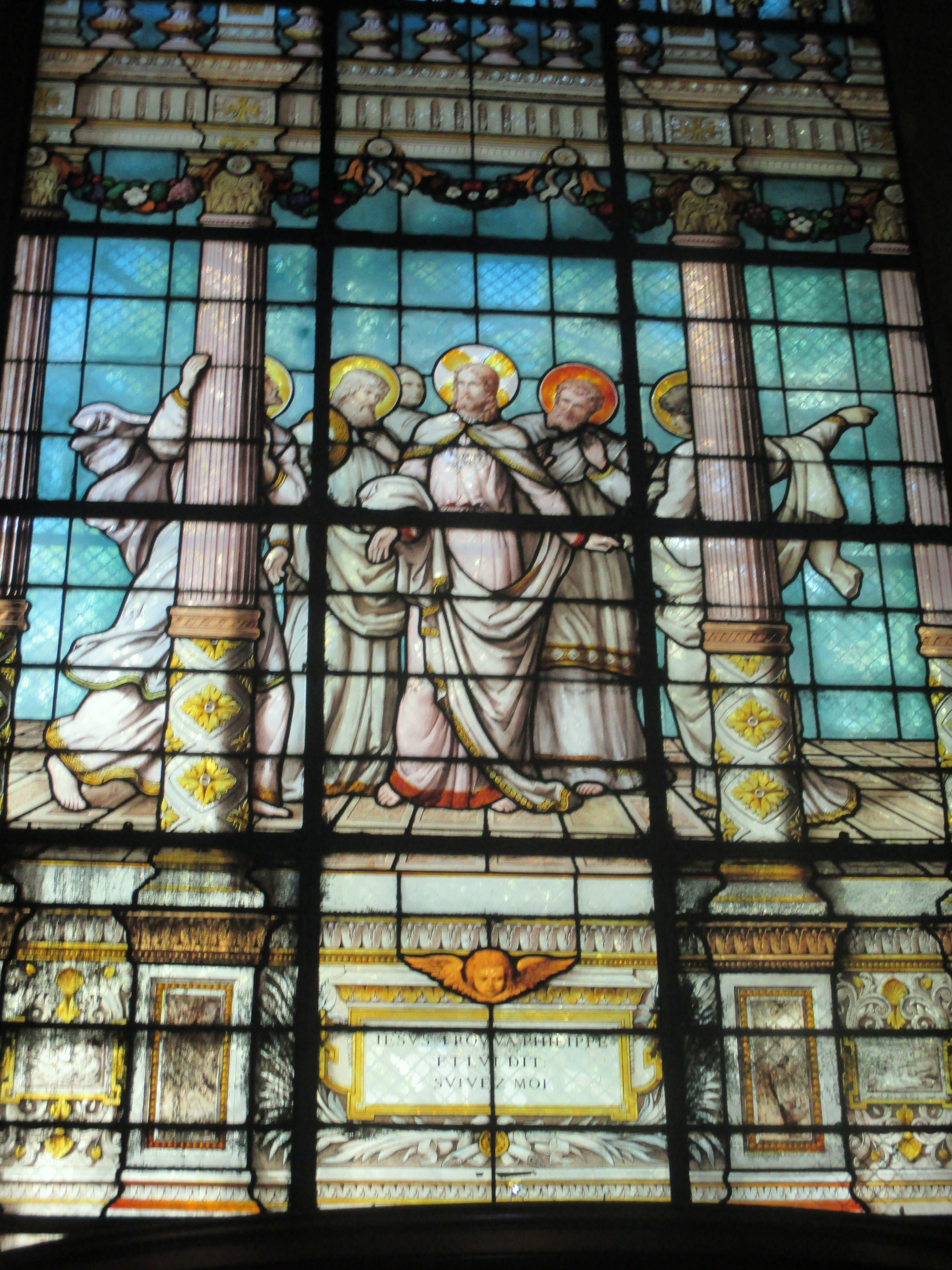
"Christ with the Apostles" by Emile Hirsch (painter)

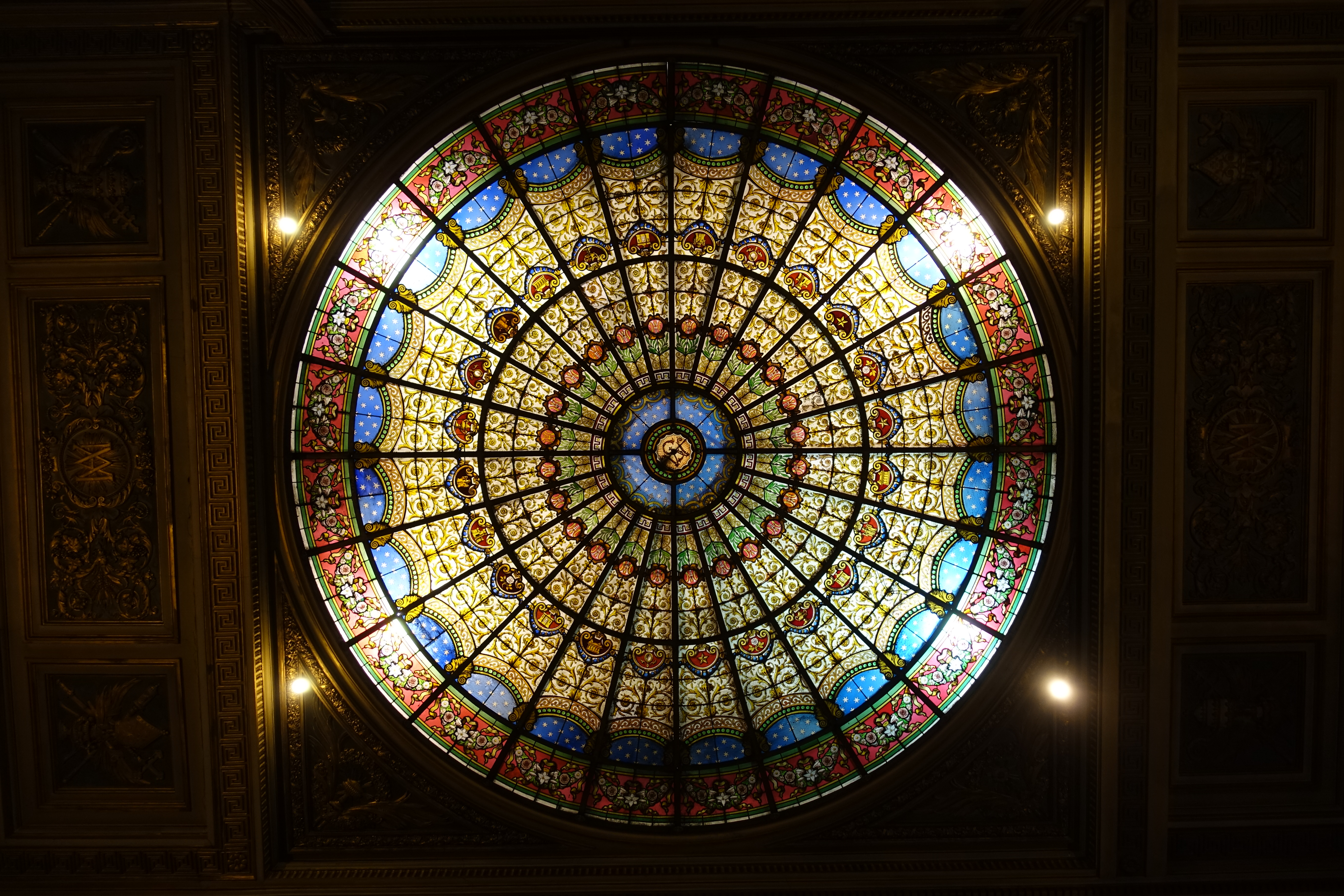
Window over the Chapel of the Virgin

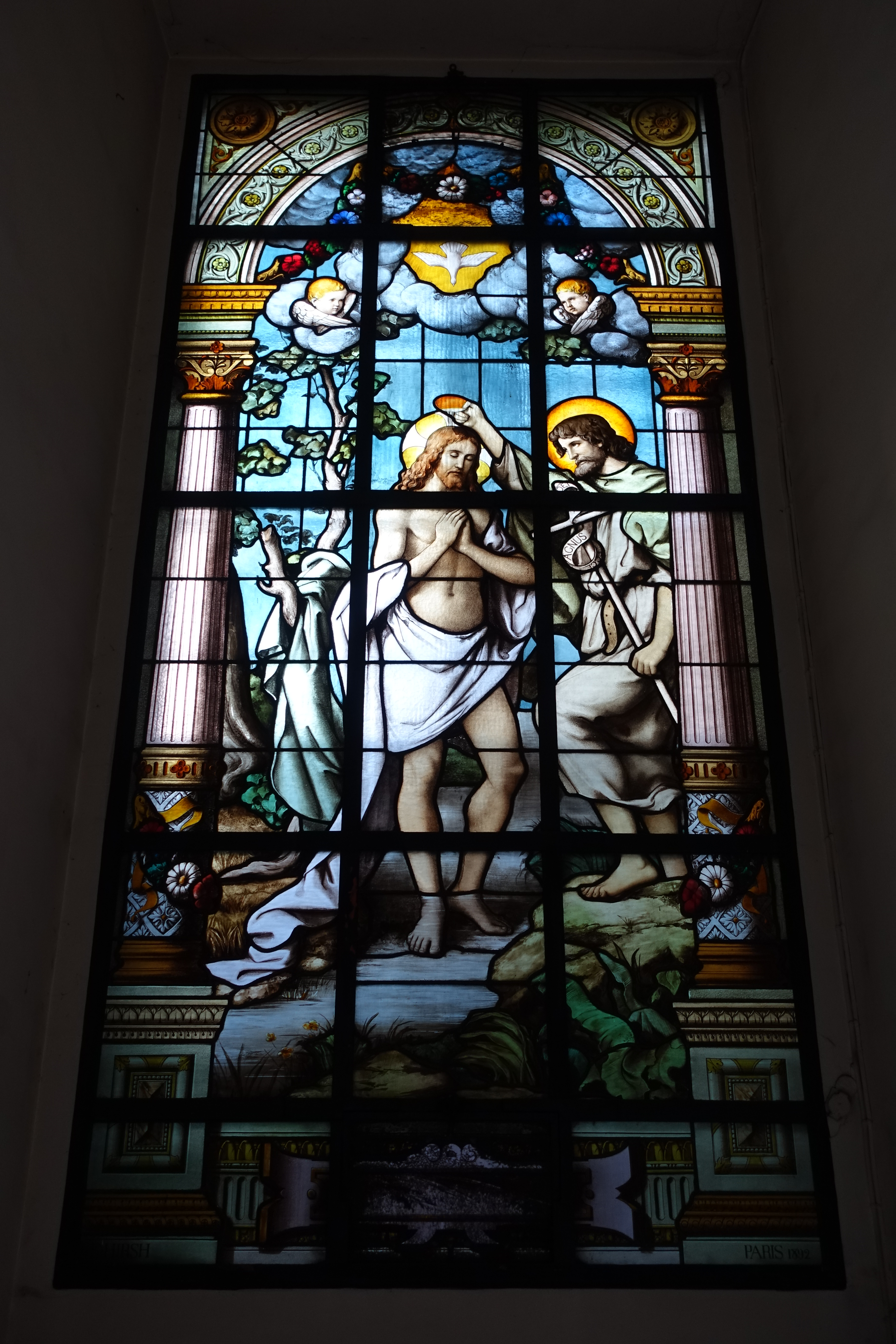
Saint John the Baptist baptizes Christ

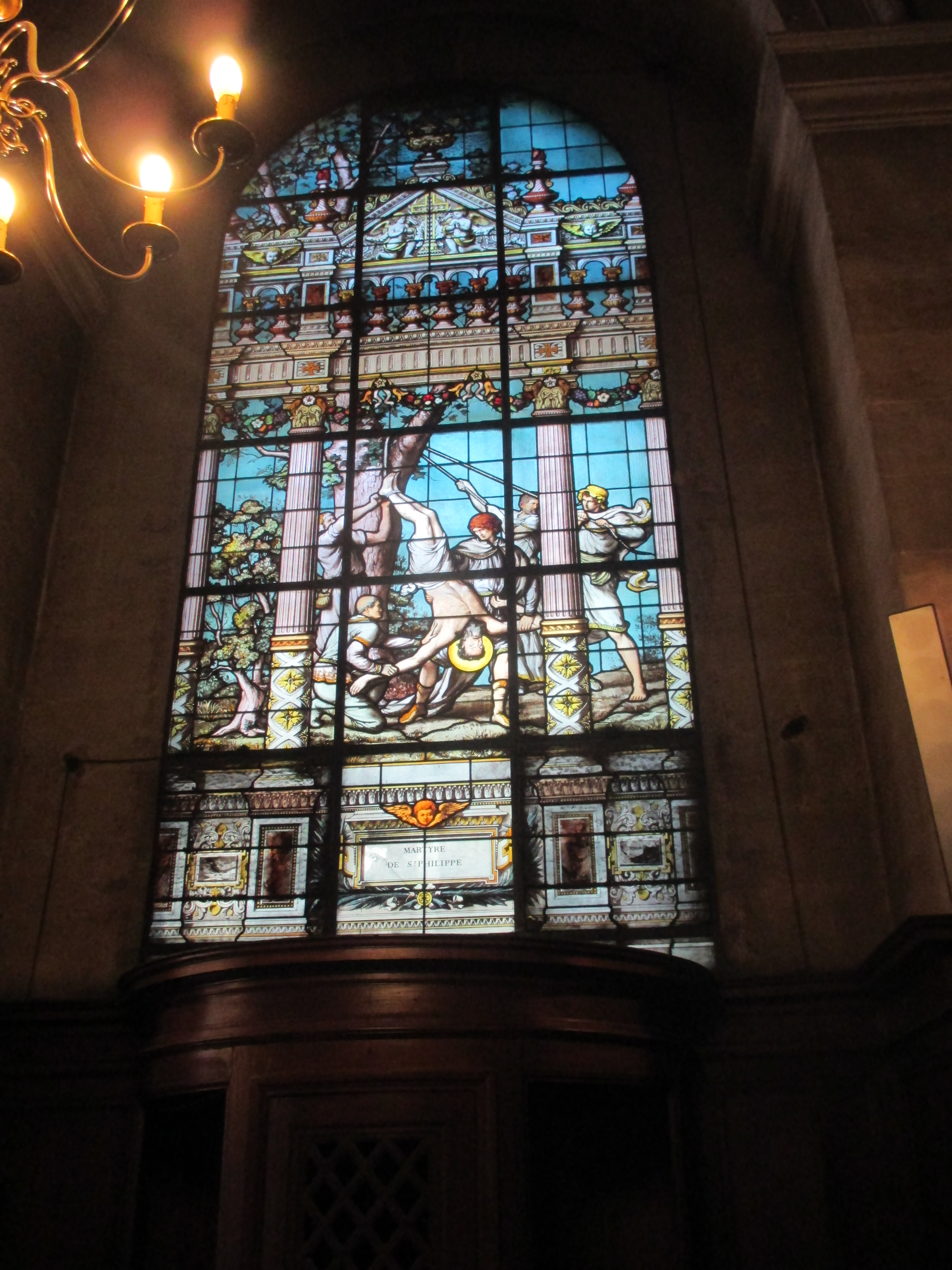
The martyrdom of Saint Philip

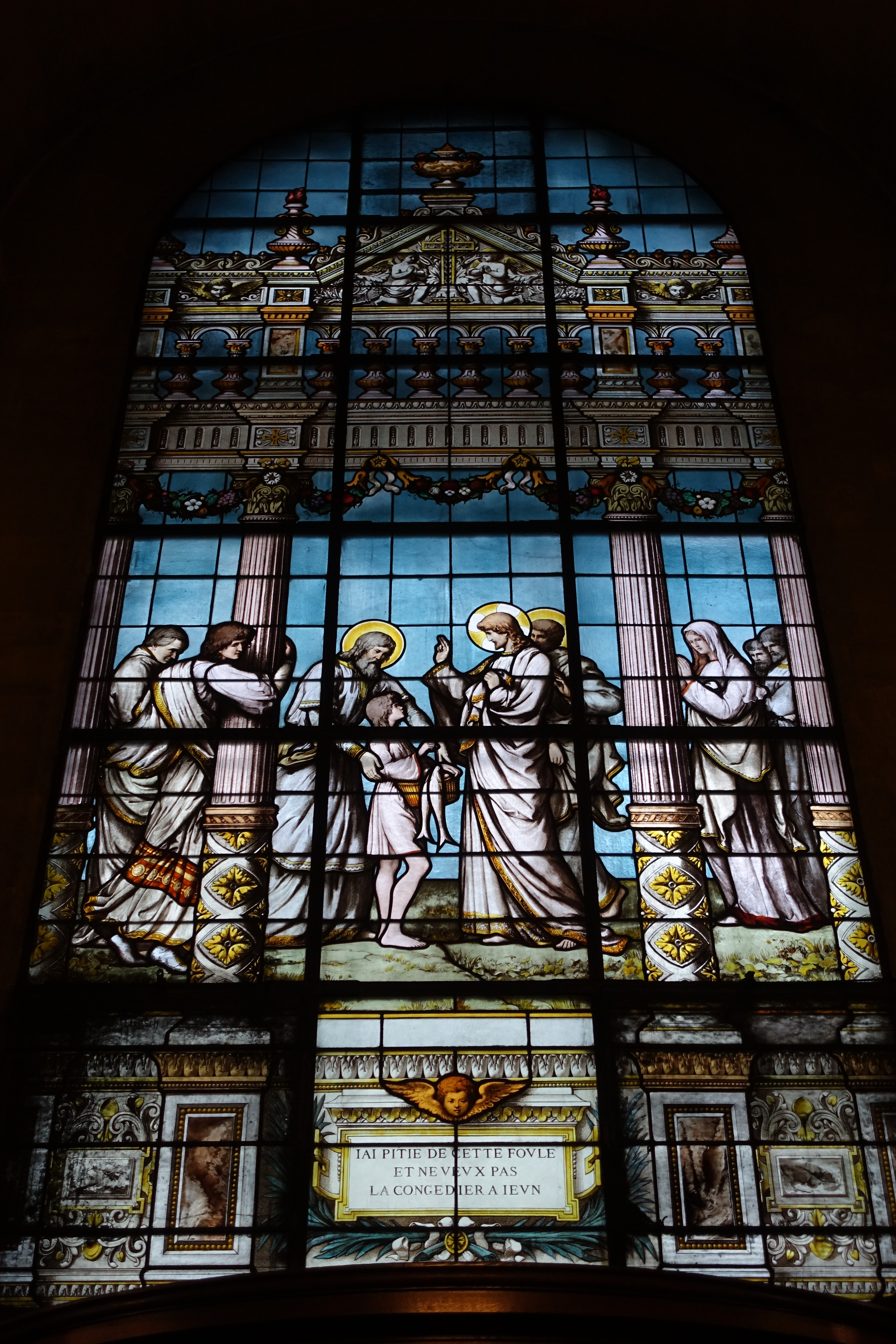
Nave window

== Organ ==
The organ of the church, built by the firm of Cavaillé-Coll-Mutin in 1903, is located in a niche under the vaults over the tribune, above the portal to the nave. The church's organists have included Alphonse Schmitt (until 1912), Henri Mulet (1923−1937) and Michel Boulnois (1937−1990).

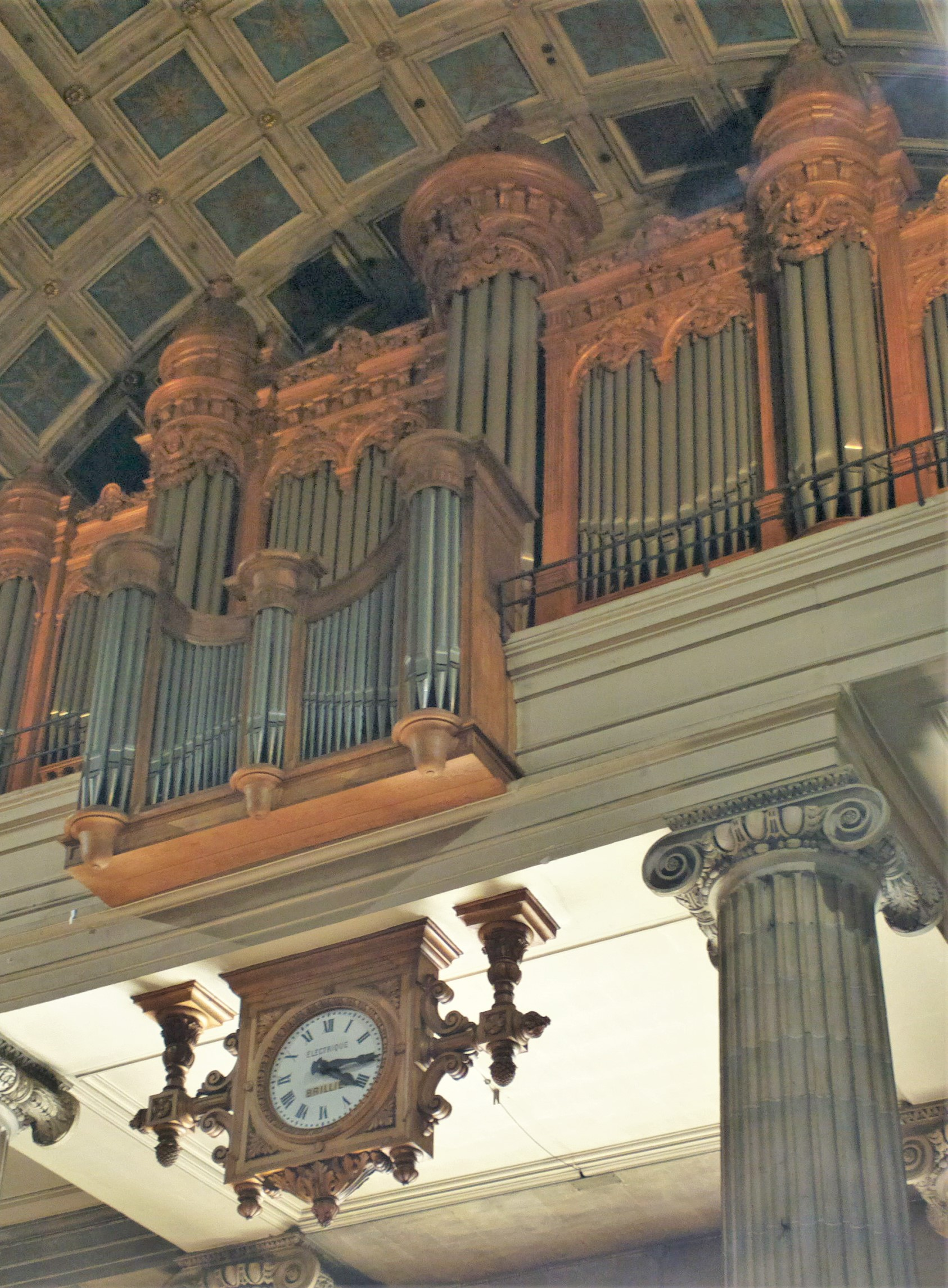

== Bibliography (in French) ==
- Dumoulin, Aline; Ardisson, Alexandra; Maingard, Jérôme; Antonello, Murielle; Églises de Paris (2010), Éditions Massin, Issy-Les-Moulineaux, ISBN 978-2-7072-0683-1 (in French)

== External Links (in French) ==
- Website of the church
- Article in patrimoine-histoire.fr, on the history and art of the church
