= Alphonse Schmitt =

French organist and composer

Alphonse Schmitt (1 December 1875 – 13 February 1912) was a French organist and composer.

Born in Kœtzingue, Alphonse Schmitt was a student of Alexandre Guilmant (c. 1901) and Charles-Marie Widor. He was an organist and composer at the Saint-Philippe-du-Roule church. He left behind a number of organ compositions, of which the Toccatina is still known.
