= Emil Hirsch (antiquarian) =

German Bookseller

Emil Hirsch (March 14, 1866 in Mergentheim – July 27, 1954 in New York) was a German antiquarian bookseller.

== Life ==
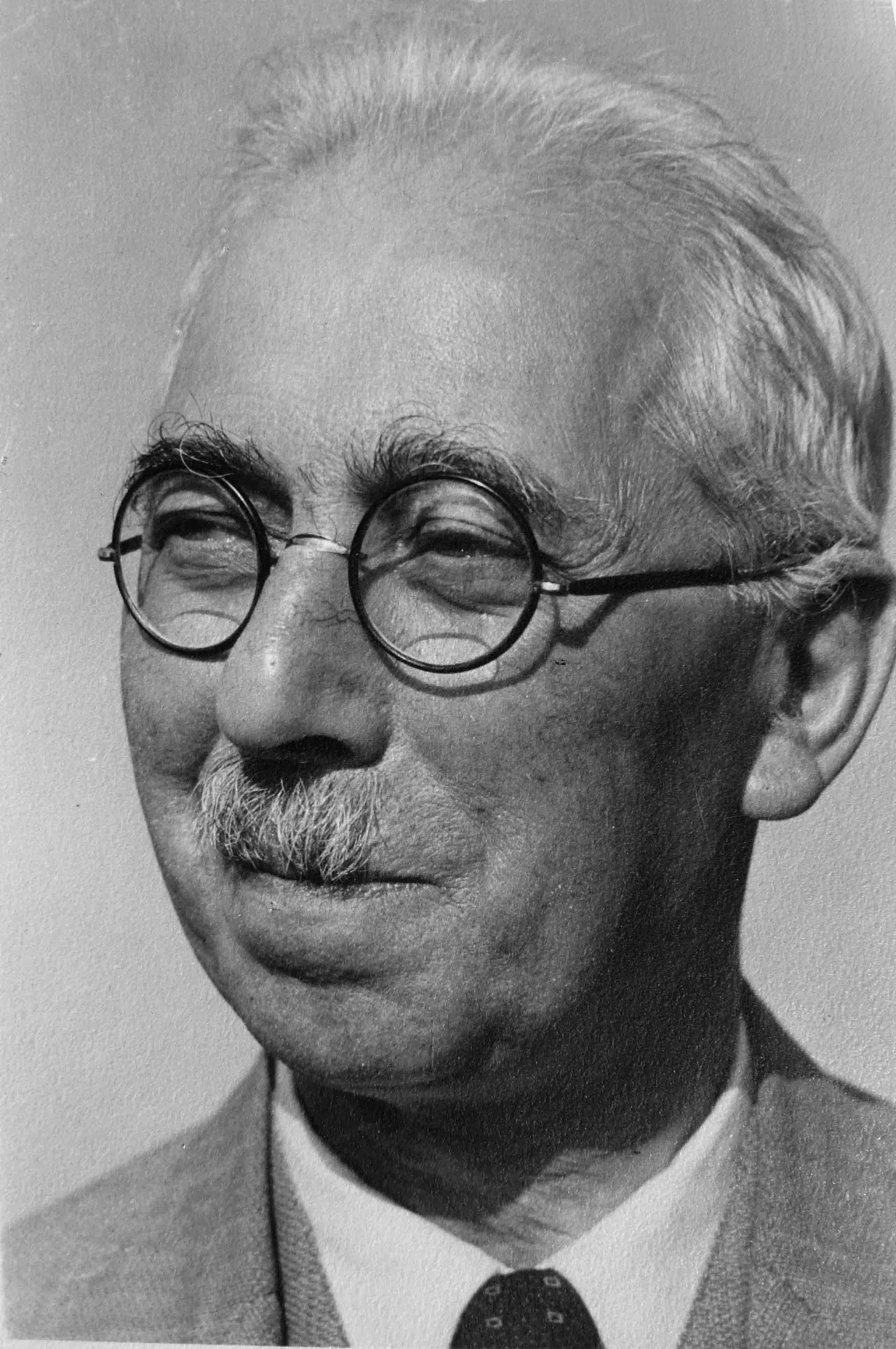
Emil Hirsch

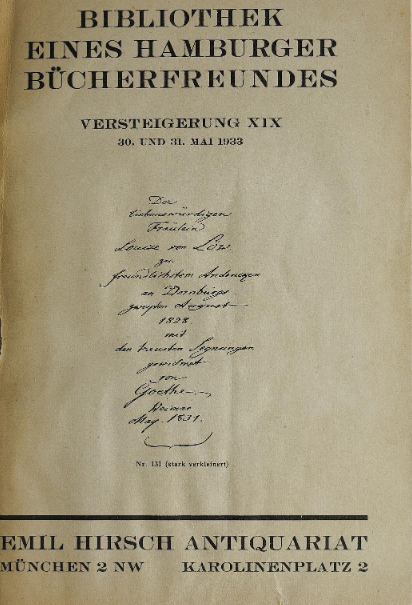
Autograph of Goethe in auction in Mai 1933

Emil Hirsch completed an apprenticeship as a bookseller with Ludwig Rosenthal in Munich at the age of 15. He then went on to work for Oscar Gerschel in Stuttgart, Zahn & Jaensch in Dresden and back to Munich, where he became a partner of Gottlob Hess in 1892. In 1897, he opened his own antiquarian bookshop there, which he later specialized in German literature and luxury prints. In 1907, he was a founding member of the Society of Munich Book Lovers. Hirsch cultivated contacts with artists and writers, he encouraged Hans von Weber in his Hundertdrucke project and supported the bibliophile Bremen press. Karl Wolfskehl, Wilhelm Trübner and Franz Marc were his friends. He also collected art and sold artworks to museums.

From 1916 onwards, Hirsch organized auctions at which books from the collections of Arthur Rümann, Karl Voll, Georg Hirth, Sayn-Wittgenstein and Piloty, among others, were auctioned off.

In 1929, his daughter Maria Hirsch married the art historian Hellmuth Wallach, who joined the business.

== Nazi era ==
After the National Socialists came to power in 1933, Hirsch was persecuted due to his Jewish heritage and forced out of his business in 1935. He managed to emigrate to the USA in 1938 with many of his books. In New York, he worked in the antiquarian bookshop on Madison Avenue run by Walter Schatzki and his son-in-law, who had already fled in 1937. Wallach ran the business in New York until 1970 and then moved to Bern.

Hirsch's own book collection was auctioned off by Menno Hertzberger in Amsterdam in 1957.

== Literature ==
- Arthur Rümann: Die drei Läden. Vater Hirsch zum 60. Geburtstag. München 1926
- Hans Lamm: Von Juden in München. Ein Gedenkbuch. Ner-Tamid, München 1959, S. 231.
- Fritz Homeyer: Deutsche Juden als Bibliophilen und Antiquare. Mohr Siebeck, Tübingen 1963, S. 34 f., 140.
- Joseph Walk (Hrsg.): Kurzbiographien zur Geschichte der Juden 1918–1945. K. G. Saur, München, 1988, ISBN 3-598-10477-4, S. 153.
- Hellmuth Wallach: Die Münchener Antiquare von einst. München: Hartung & Hartung 1994
- Ernst Fischer: Verleger, Buchhändler & Antiquare aus Deutschland und Österreich in der Emigration nach 1933. Verband Deutscher Antiquare, Elbingen 2011, ISBN 978-3-9812223-2-6, S. 139f.

== See also ==
Degenerate art

The Holocaust
