= Emile Hirsch (painter) =

French stained-glass artist and painter (1832–1904)

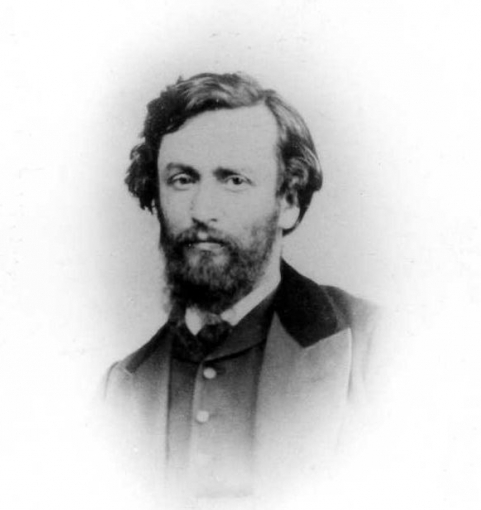
- -ca 1875
- Born: 23 July 1832; Metz, France
- Died: 17 August 1904 (aged 72)
- Education: École nationale supérieure des Beaux-Arts
- Occupation: Stained glass artist

Emile Hirsch (1832 – 1904) was a French stained glass artist.

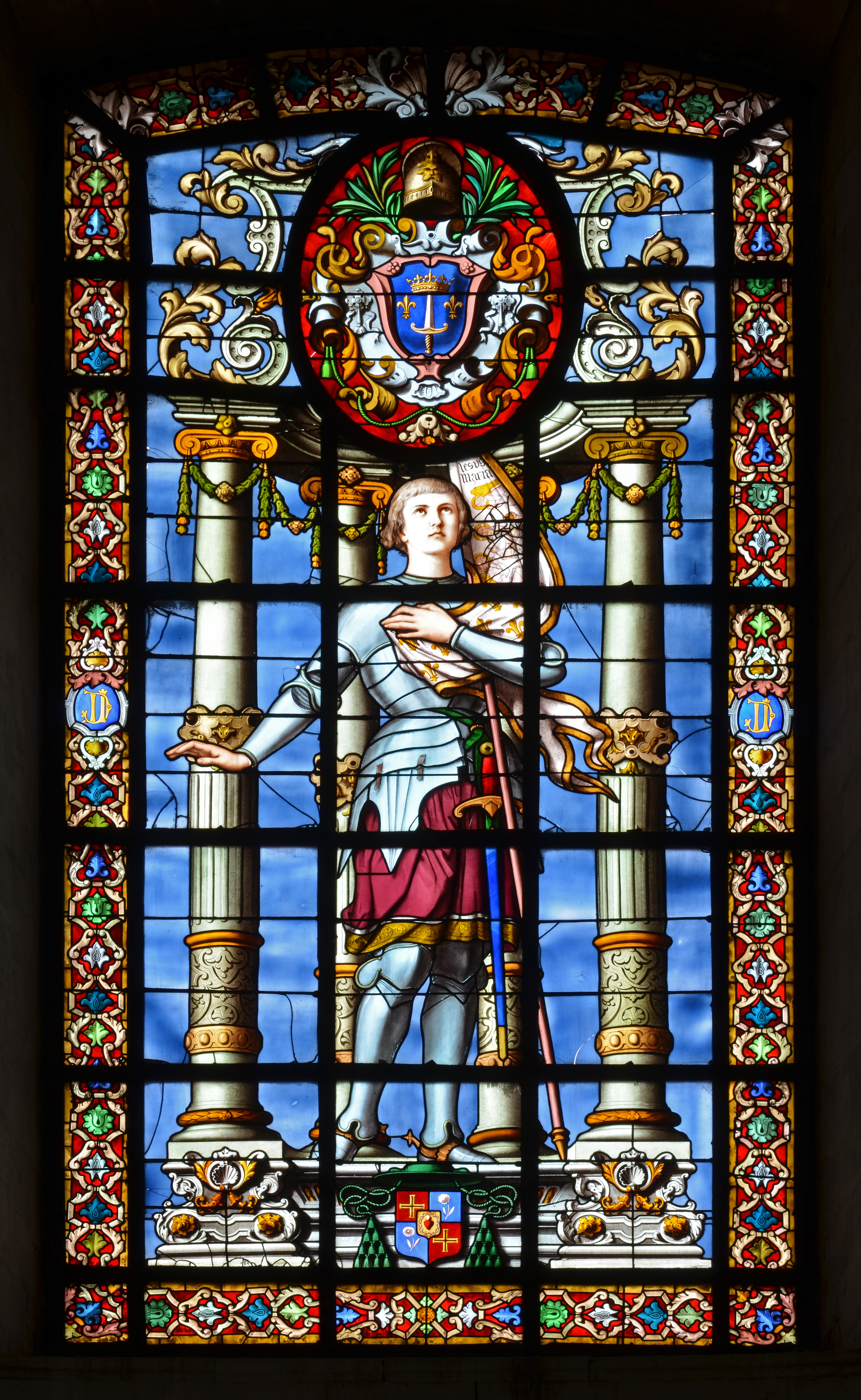
Joan of Arc at La Rochelle Cathedral, painted by Hirsch.
