= Palais Ficquelmont =

Palace in St. Petersburg, Russia

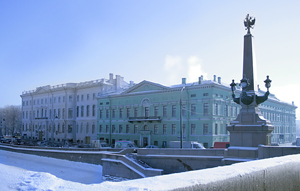
Palais Ficquelmont, St-Petersburg

The Palais Ficquelmont (Ficquelmont palaces) are palatial residences which belonged to the counts de Ficquelmont, one of Lorraine's most illustrious aristocratic dynasty that has spread across Europe as the Duchy merged into the Habsburg Empire then into the Kingdom of France and once again after the burst of the French Revolution.

== List of Palais Ficquelmont ==
Several palaces bear the name of the comital family:

- Palais Ficquelmont in St. Petersburg
- Palais Ficquelmont in Prague

Other palaces might bear Ficquelmont in their name but are not to be mistaken with the formally Ficquelmont palaces :

- Palais Mollard-Clary in Vienna is sometimes known as Palais Mollard-Clary-Ficquelmont as its grandest era was when the princess Elisabeth-Alexandrine Clary-und-Aldringen, born countess de Ficquelmont, inhabited it.
- Palais Kutuzov in St-Petersburg is sometimes known as Palais Kutuzov-Ficquelmont as it is the birthplace of countess Dolly von Tiesenhausen, who married count Charles-Louis de Ficquelmont, and because the couple inhabited it several times.

== Pictures ==
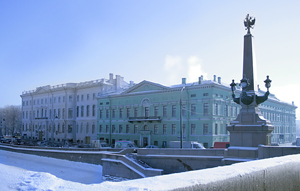
View of Palais Ficquelmont, St-Petersburg

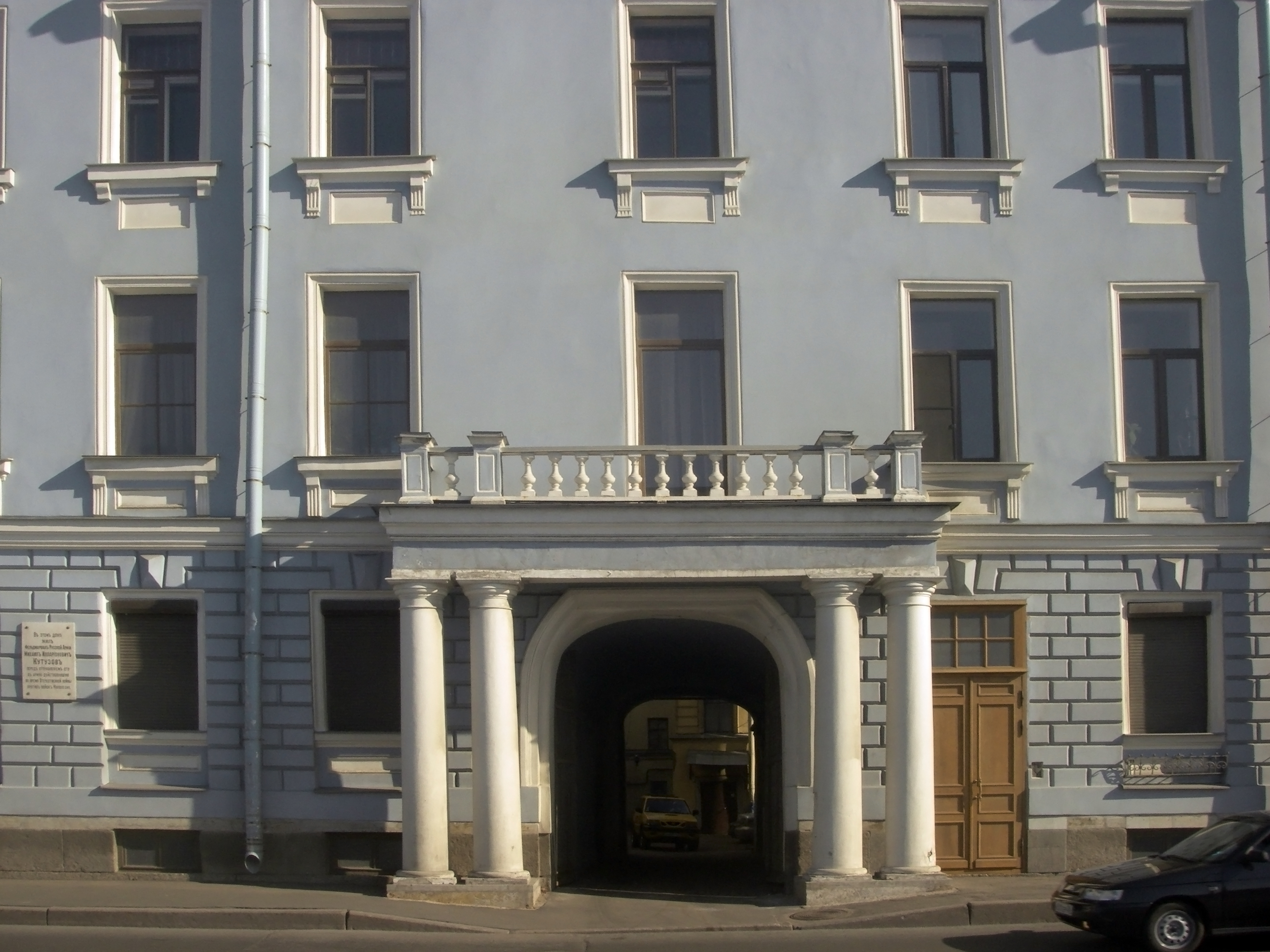
Entrance of Palais Ficquelmont, St-Petersburg

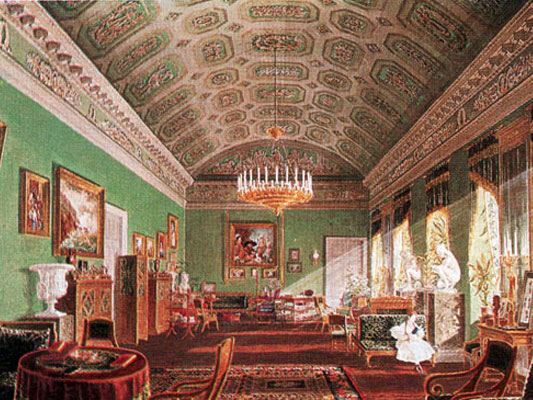
Interior of Palais Ficquelmont, St-Petersburg

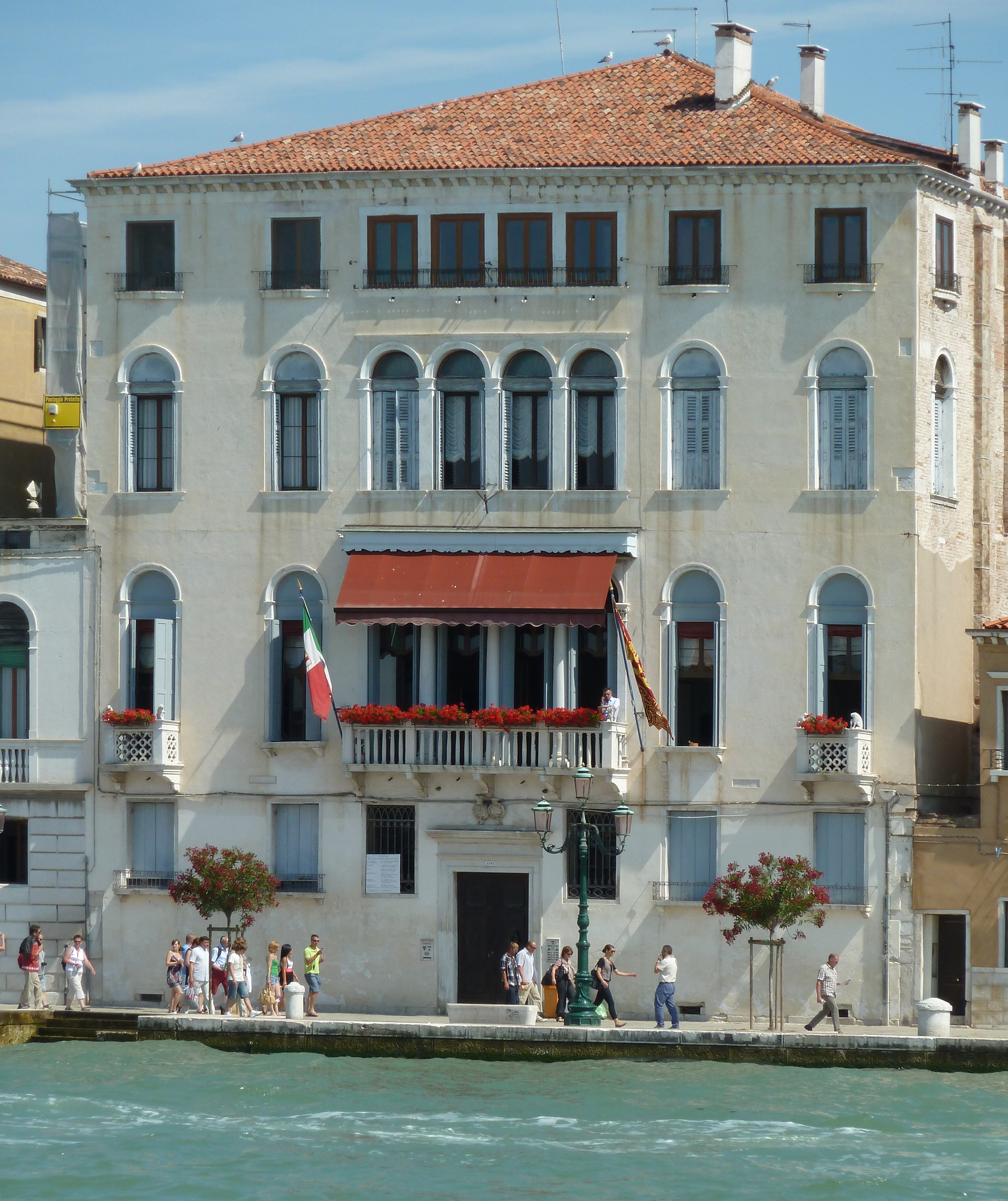
View of Palais Ficquelmont, Venice

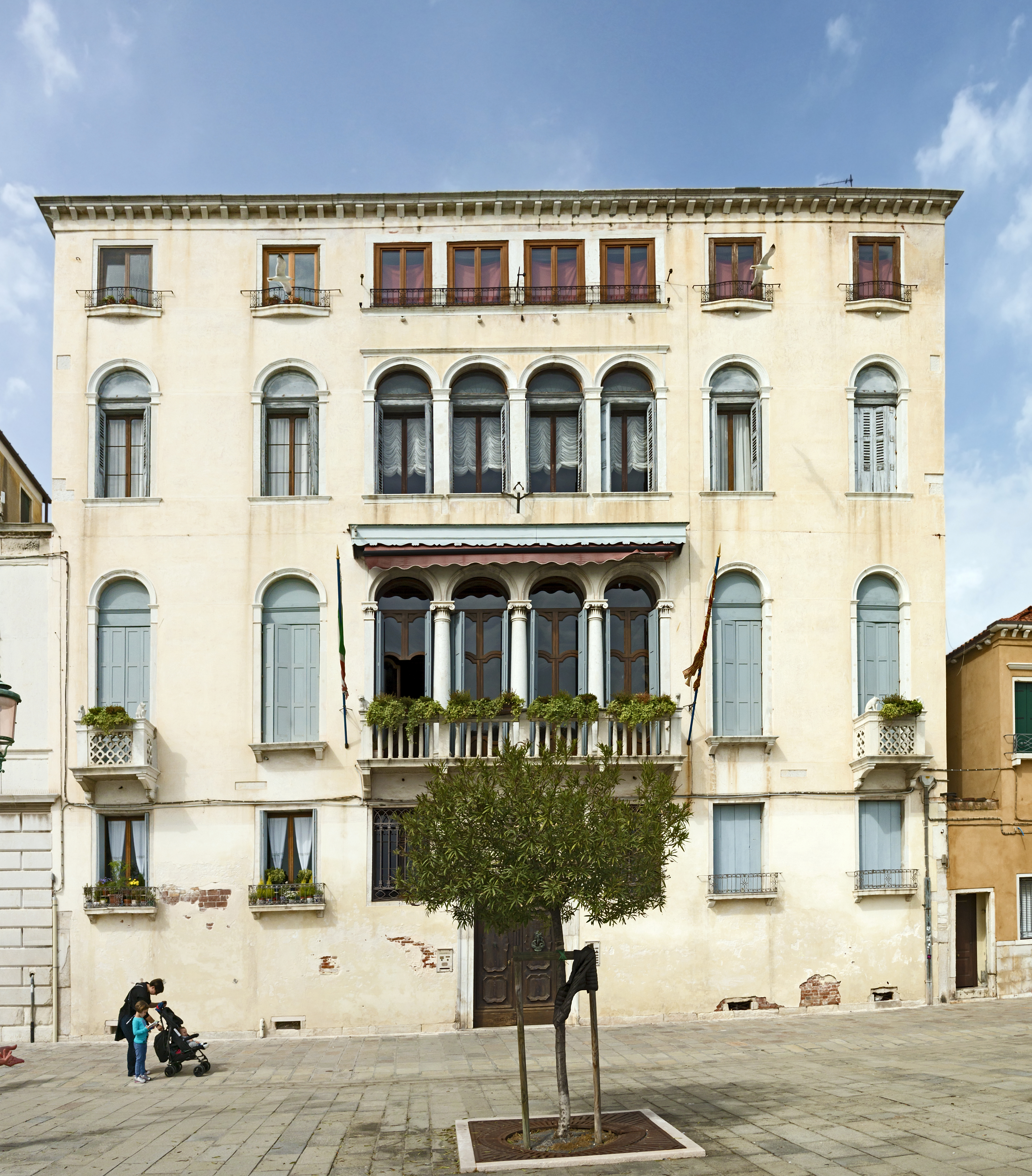
Facade of Palais Ficquelmont, Venice

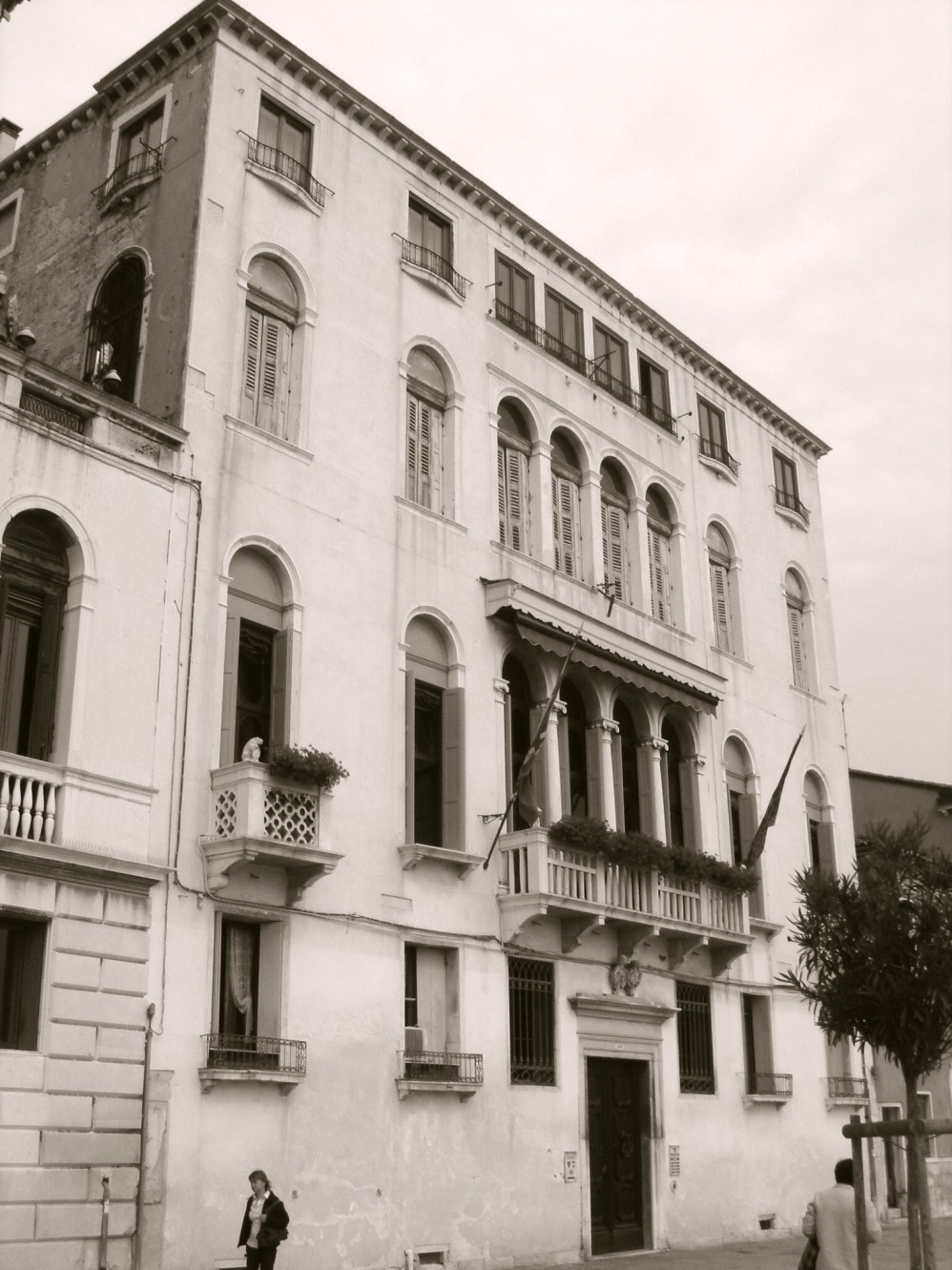
View of Palais Ficquelmont, Venice
