= Īvande Manor =

Manor in Latvia

- Īvande parish, Courland, Latvia
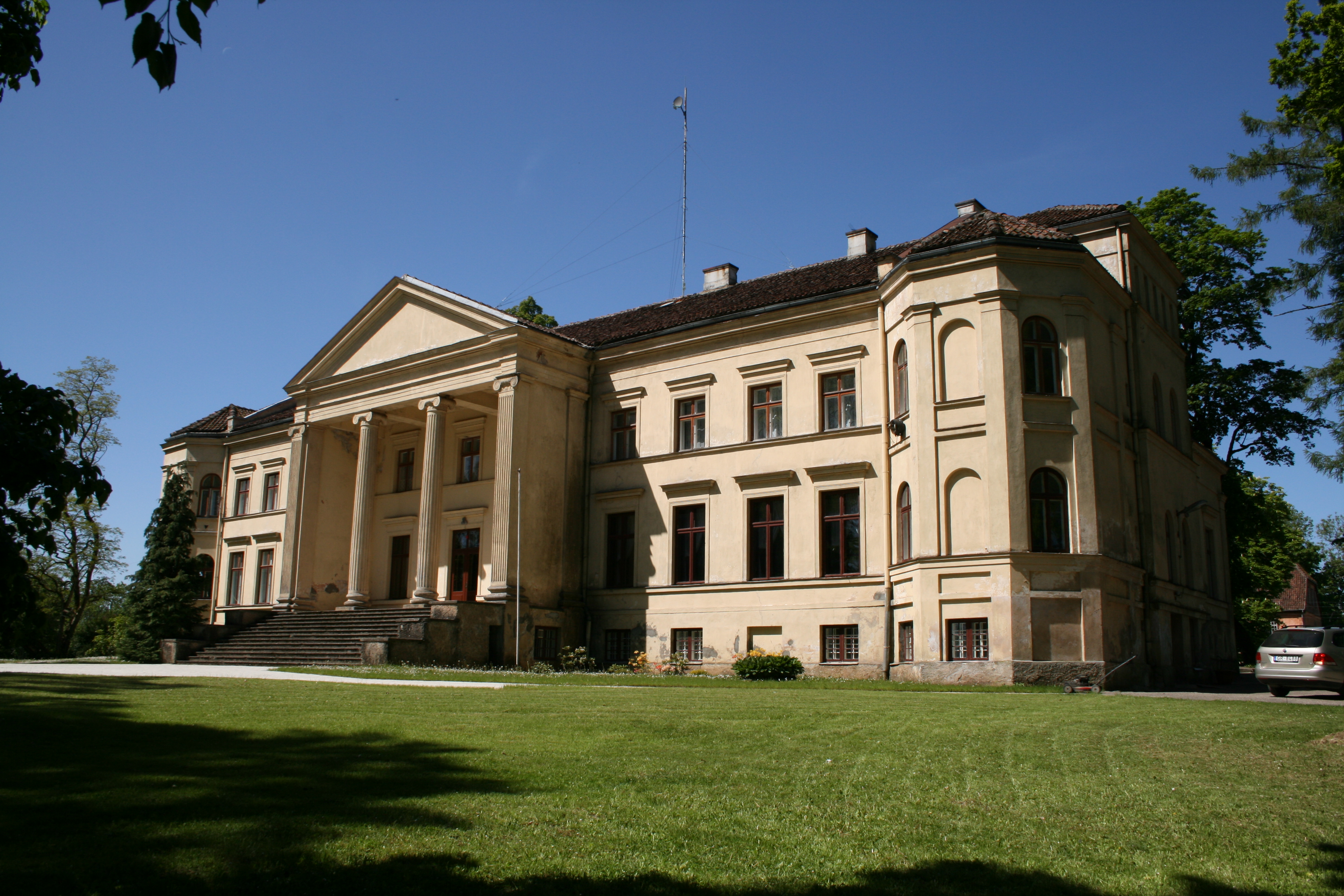

Site information
- Type: Manor

Location
- Coordinates: 56°59′39.09″N 21°46′27.49″E

Īvande Manor (Latvian: Īvandes muižas pils), also called Lielīvande Manor (German: Schloß Groß-Iwanden), is a manor house in Īvande parish in Kuldīga municipality in the historical region of Courland, in western Latvia.

== History ==
The manor Groß-Iwanden was created by the merger of several small estates. In the middle of the 16th century the estate was owned by the family of Rudolf Steinrat. The property remained in the Steinrat family for three generations and was enlarged by them. In 1643 it was sold to Hofmarschall Christof von Sacken. In 1646 the property was sold again, this time to Dettlof von Tiesenhausen. The estate was inherited in 1690 by Ernst Gotthard von Manteuffel-Szoege. There being no heirs, the property was sold in 1750 to Friedrich Johann von Schlippenbach on Gaicken, and Muischazeem. In 1821 property was sold to Peter von Medem. In 1853 the estate was resold to Baron Eduard von Heyking. The property remained was subsequently in the possession of the Heyking family until its expropriation in 1920.

The present house was built as a neoclassical building around 1860 to designs by the architect Theodor Zeiler. On the park side, there is a huge portico supported by two free-standing and two imposing massive colossal Ionic columns. The main building was destroyed by fire in 1905, but rebuilt in 1912–1913. The manor house and its extensive park is now in very good condition and in use as a youth hostel.

== See also ==
- List of palaces and manor houses in Latvia
