= Ferdinand von Tiesenhausen =

Russian noble and military officer (1782–1805)

Count Berend Gregor Ferdinand von Tiesenhausen
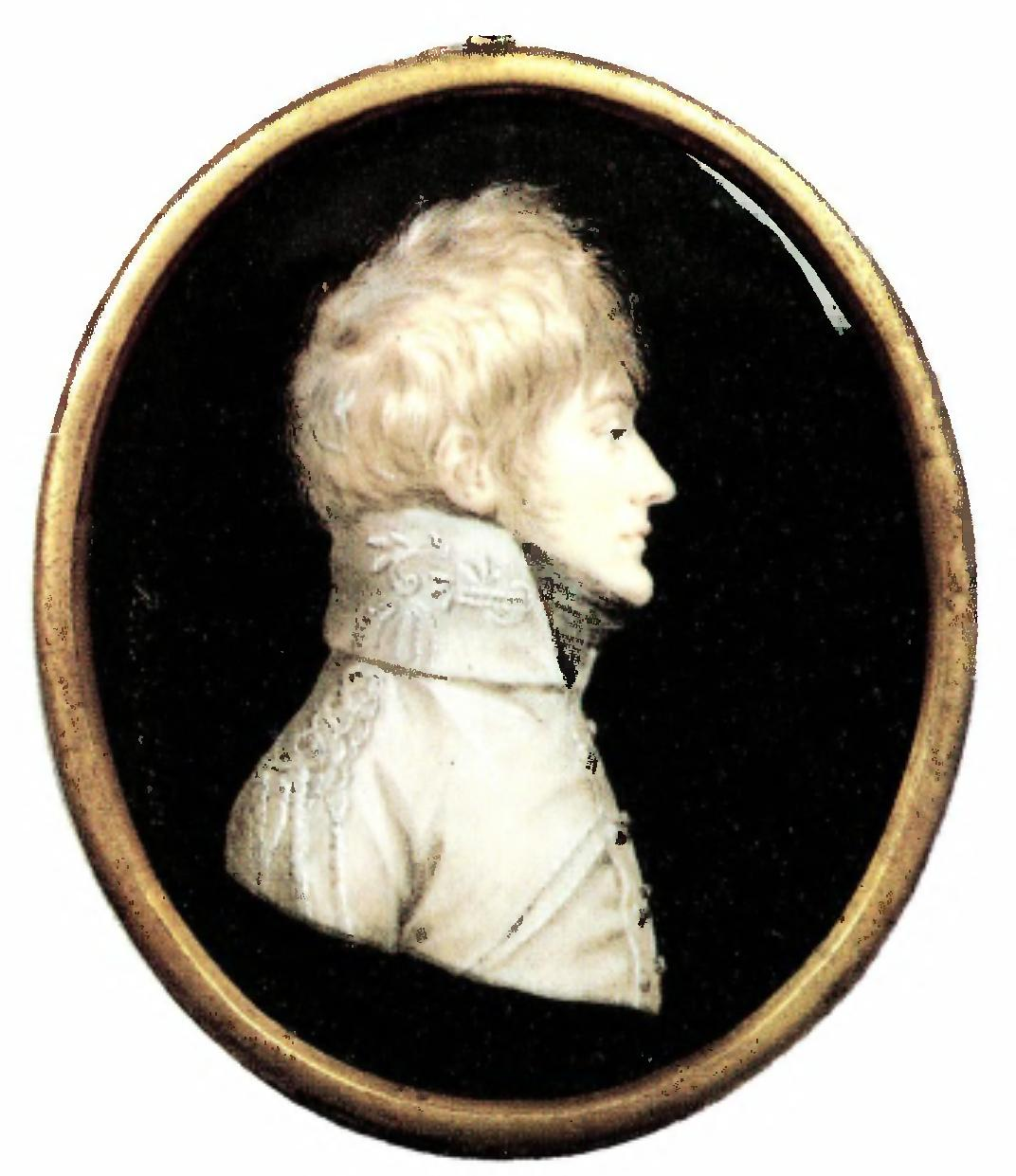
- Ferdinand von Tiesenhausen in 1800
- Born: June 1, 1782; Reval, Russian Empire
- Died: December 2, 1805 (aged 23); Straßendorf, Austrian Empire
- Military career
- Allegiance: Russia
- Conflicts: Battle of Austerlitz

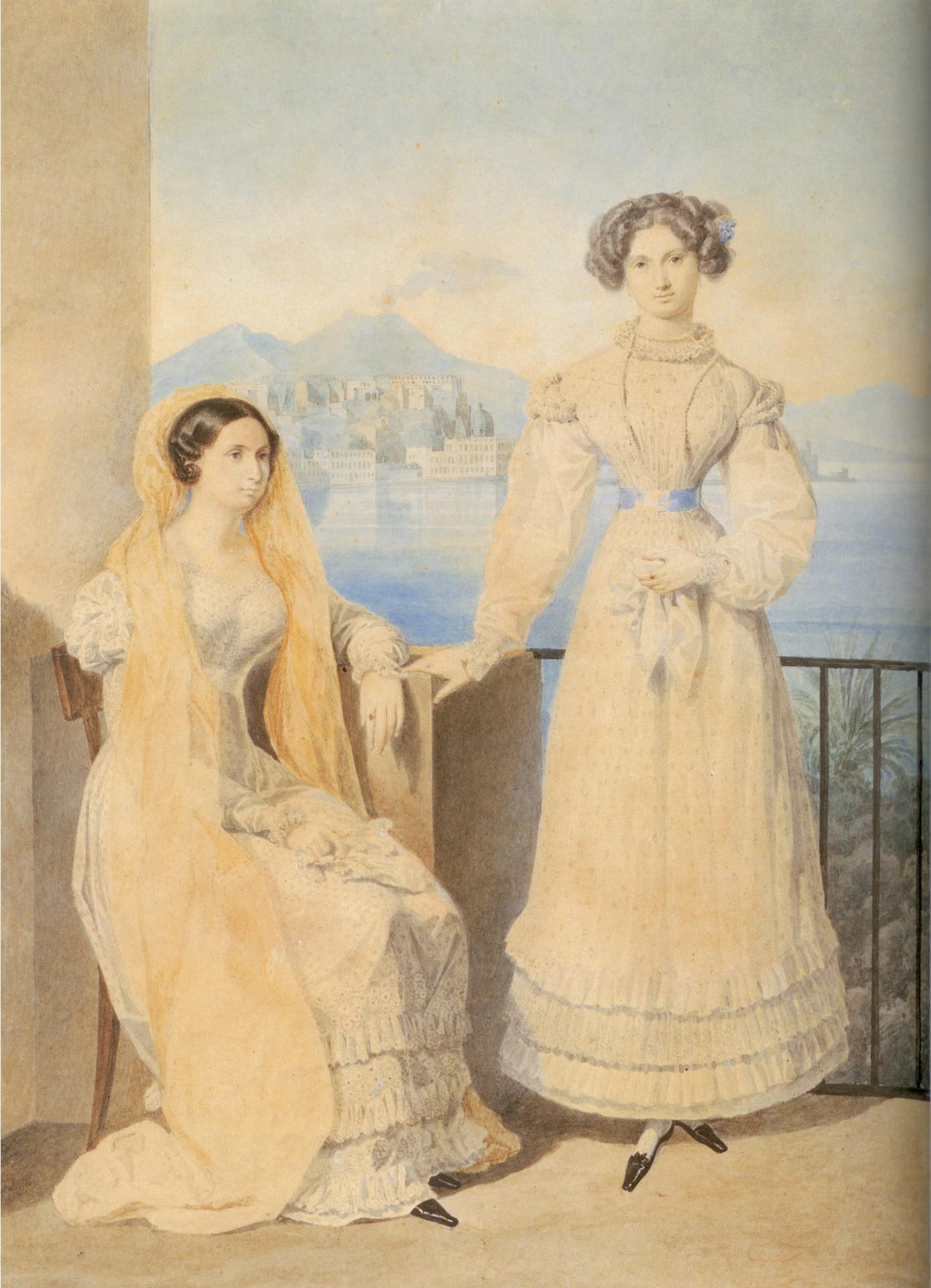
Dorothea de Ficquelmont and her sister, Catherine von Tiesenhausen. Painting by Alexander Brullov, 1825.

Count Berend Gregor Ferdinand von Tiesenhausen (Russian: Фёдор Ива́нович фон Тизенга́узен, romanized: Fyodor Ivanovich fon Tizengauzen; June 1, 1782 – December 2, 1805) was a Russian noble and military officer of German Baltic origin.

== Biography ==
Count Ferdinand von Tiesenhausen was the scion of an ancient German Baltic noble family that settled in Livonia during the Baltic crusades in the first half of the 12th century, going on to become one of the wealthiest and most prominent noble lines in the region (Tiesenhausen or Tyzenhauz). The son of Count Hans Heinrich von Tiesenhausen (1741–1815) and his wife Catherine, born Princess von Stackelberg (1753–1826), Tiesenhausen married Princess Elizabeth Golenishchev-Kutuzov, daughter of the Russian war hero Mikhail Kutuzov. Elizabeth gave birth to two daughters: Catherine (1803–1888), later a lady-in-waiting of the Imperial Court of Russia, and Dorothea (1804–1863), the future wife of Count Charles Louis de Ficquelmont.

Tiesenhausen chose a military career. He fought under his father-in-law's command and eventually became the aide-de-camp of Emperor Alexander I of Russia. He was fatally wounded at the battle of Austerlitz and fell with a flag in his hands. Napoleon, passing close to the gravely wounded Count, said: ″What a glorious death!″. The character Andrei Bolkonsky in Tolstoy's War and Peace was inspired by Tiesenhausen. The Count was taken to the Malik family's inn at nearby Straßendorf (nowadays Silničná, part of Žarošice municipality), but he did not survive. He was first buried in the inn's garden, then exhumed and moved to his family's estates in Reval. A marble obelisk was erected in his memory in the Lutheran Cathedral Our Lady of Reval.

== See also ==
- von Tiesenhausen
