= De Ficquelmont family =

Extinct noble family from Lorraine

de Ficquelmont family
- Or, gules three enhanced pickets, ensigned with a passant wolf sable
- Country: Duchy of Lorraine; Kingdom of France; Austrian Empire; Kingdom of Belgium; French Republic
- Titles: Count of Ficquelmont (Austria); Count in Netherland (1822); Count of Ficquelmont de Vyle in Belgium (1855)

The de Ficquelmont family is a noble family from Lorraine dating back to the 14th century. Its filiation is established with Henry de Ficquelmont, a knight who died before 1386.

This family produced different branches in France, Austria, and Belgium. It became extinct in 1948 in the male line with Louis-Charles de Ficquelmont de Vyle, and in the female line in 1991 with countess Ghislaine de Ficquelmont de Vyle.

== Origins ==
The origins of the Ficquelmont Family is the lordship of Ficquelmont (currently Thumeréville) in Lorraine, near Briey

The Ficquelmont family is known since 1138, with Gérard de Ficquelmont who gave a donation in 1138 but its filiation is established without doubts only since Henry de Ficquelmont, knight, dead before 1386.

According to the genealogist Charles Poplimont, who wrote a genealogy of the de Ficquelmont family in La Belgique Héraldique (1866), Henri de Ficquelmont, was married with Marie le Loup and he was son of Erard de Ficquelmont and grandson of Manassés de Ficquelmont, who was living in 1346 and Marie Dannoy.

== Lorraine and the Holy Roman Empire ==
In Lorraine where they sat as hereditary members of the upper house of the Parlement de Nancy, the ruling institution of French Lorraine that also served as the courts of appeal of the Royal province. During that period, the Ficquelmonts' primary seats were the châteaux of Dieuze (birthplace of Count Charles-Louis de Ficquelmont (1777-1857), Parroy and their Hôtel in Nancy. The Ficquelmonts were also instrumental in founding and funding several Lorrainer religious institutions such as the Holy Cross College of Nancy, the Cathedral of Metz and the abbeys of Remiremont and Flavigny.

The members of the Ficquelmont family had been Great Officers of the Ducal Court of Lorraine: lords chamberlain, lords master of ceremonies or lords commander of the Dukes. In the 17th and 18th century were:

- Leonard de Ficquelmont, colonel of Charles IV, Duke of Lorraine, commanding the Blainville regiment;
- Robert de Ficquelmont, Great-chamberlain of Charles III, Duke of Lorraine;
- his grandson, Jean-François de Ficquelmont, Great-chamberlain and colonel of the guard of Leopold I, Duke of Lorraine, commanding the dukal cavalry;
- his son, Reichsgraf Charles de Ficquelmont Great-chamberlain of Francis I of Lorraine, Holy Roman Emperor, colonel of HIM's cuirassiers commanding the imperial guard's cavalry;
- his son, Reichsgraf Jacques-Charles de Ficquelmont, colonel of the guard and Great-chamberlain of Francis I of Lorraine, Holy Roman Emperor, commanding the cavalry regiment of Kalchreuth then of Thun.

The Ficquelmonts took part of the chivalry Orders of Saint John of Jerusalem of Rhodes and of Malta, of the Golden Fleece. They also often fought as warlords at the service of France, Spain and the Papacy. The perfect illustration being Count Leonard de Ficquelmont, colonel of Charles IV, Duke of Lorraine, colonel of King Philip V of Spain who died in 1709 during the War of the Spanish Succession in Cataluna.

== France and Austria ==
After Empress Maria Theresa of Austria had married Emperor Francis of Lorraine, the family was under the rule of the Habsburgs, but, by the Treaty of Vienna, the Duchy of Lorraine became part of the Kingdom of France and the Ficquelmonts were allowed to choose to serve and live either in France or in the Empire.

=== France ===
Some others members of the family had chosen France. The count Charles Henri de Ficquelmont was introduced at the Honors of the French Court (Honneurs de la Cour) in 1777 and 1789.

In 1789, during the French Revolution, the Ficquelmonts, as aristocrats, were targeted by the Revolution, and several members of the family were beheaded leaving the remaining ones no other choice than fleeing the country, joining fellow aristocrats as émigrés.

After the French Revolution, the Ficquelmont family remained divided into different lines and spread in Austria, France and Belgium.

=== Austrian Empire ===
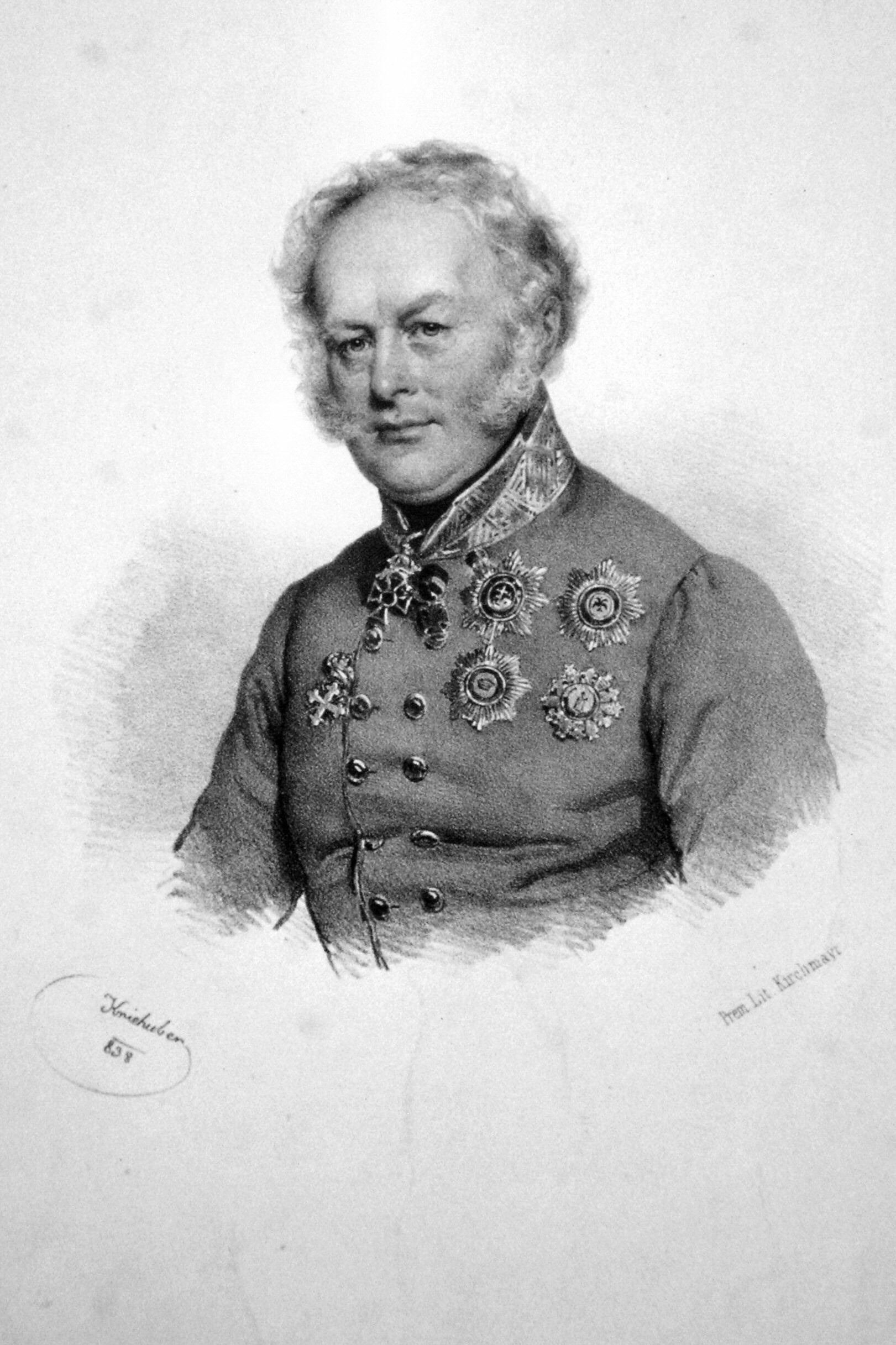
Count Charles Louis de Ficquelmont

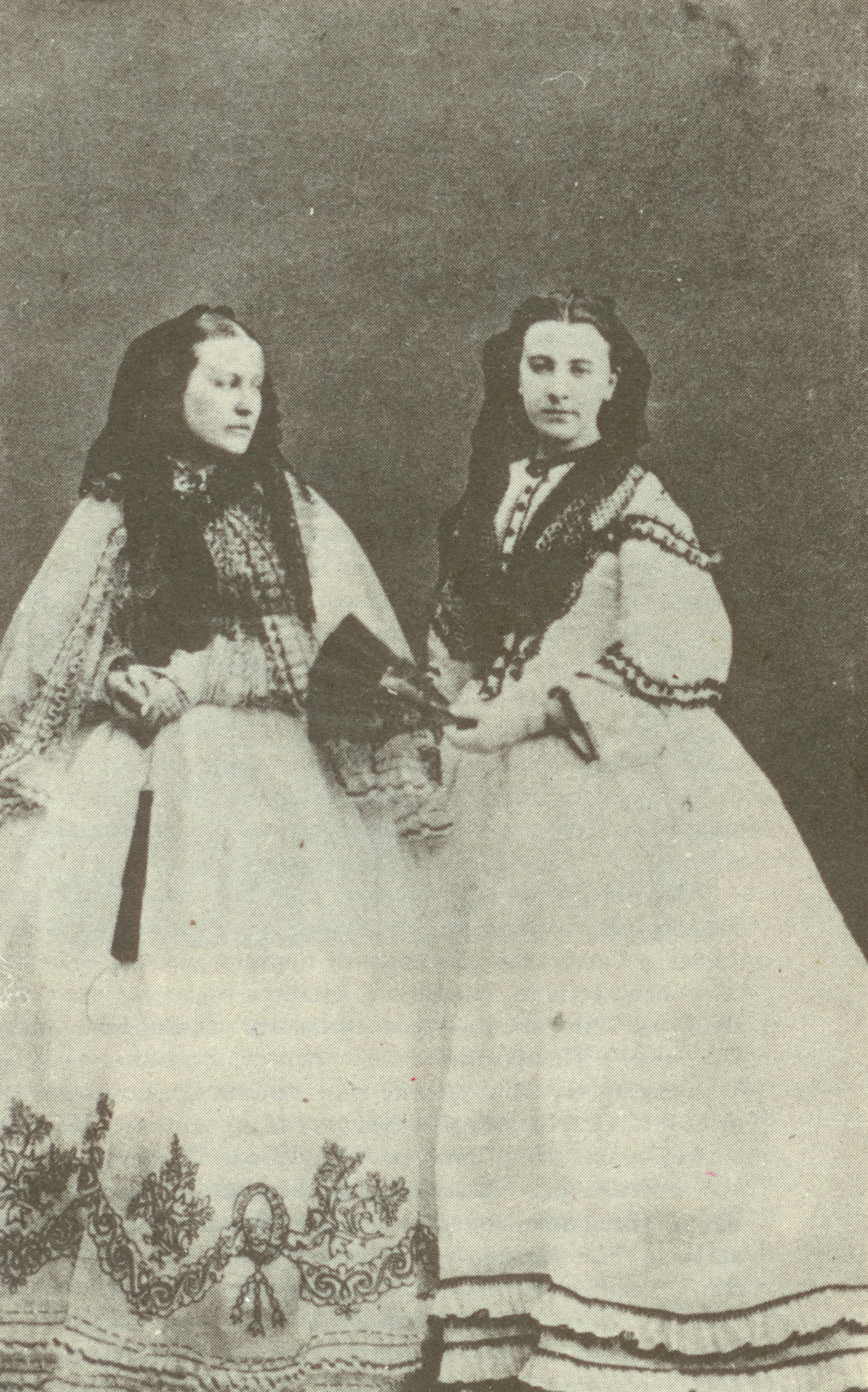
Elisabeth-Alexandrine de Ficquelmont, princess Clary-und-Aldringen and her daughter

Some Ficquelmonts who had followed Emperor Francis of Lorraine to the Imperial Court and therefore already established themselves in Austria, chose to settle in Austrian territory. Of that tight branch are Reichsgraf Charles de Ficquelmont, Great-chamberlain of Francis I, Holy Roman Emperor, colonel of HIM's cuirassiers commanding the imperial guard's cavalry and his son, Reichsgraf Jacques-Charles de Ficquelmont, colonel of the guard and Great-chamberlain of Francis I, Holy Roman Emperor, commanding the cavalry regiment of Kalchreuth then of Thun. By the end of the 18th century, they had settled in large estates in the then Austrian Netherlands.

Part of the French Ficquelmonts chose to emigrate to Austria where the family had kept close ties (for instance, Charles de Ficquelmont (1724–1792), had followed Francis I of Lorraine, Holy Roman Emperor at the Imperial Court of Vienna when he was 12 and had stayed there ever since serving as colonel of the Imperial guard and (from 1764) Great-chamberlain of Emperors Francis I and Joseph II) various estates and strong supports all the way to the Habsburgs themselves (for instance, Archduchess Marie-Christine personally placed count Joseph de Ficquelmont in Emperor Leopold II's care in a letter dated from January 30, 1792).

This branch took part of the counter revolutionary's Army of the Princes and Imperial Austrian Army. It is best represented by:

- Count Charles Louis de Ficquelmont (Reichsgraf von Ficquelmont), born in the castle of Dieuze on March 23, 1777; he became one of the most powerful Austrian diplomat and statesman of his time and even succeeded Prince Klemens von Metternich as acting Minister-President of the Austrian Empire.

He married countess Dorothea von Tiesenhausen, granddaughter of Prince Mikhail Kutuzov, Masrshall of the Russian army and hero of the Napoleonic Wars. Dorothea and Charles-Louis only had one child:

- Elizabeth-Alexandrine, countess de Ficquelmont by birth and princess Clary-und-Aldringen by marriage, last countess of the Austrian branch.

== Netherlands and Belgium ==
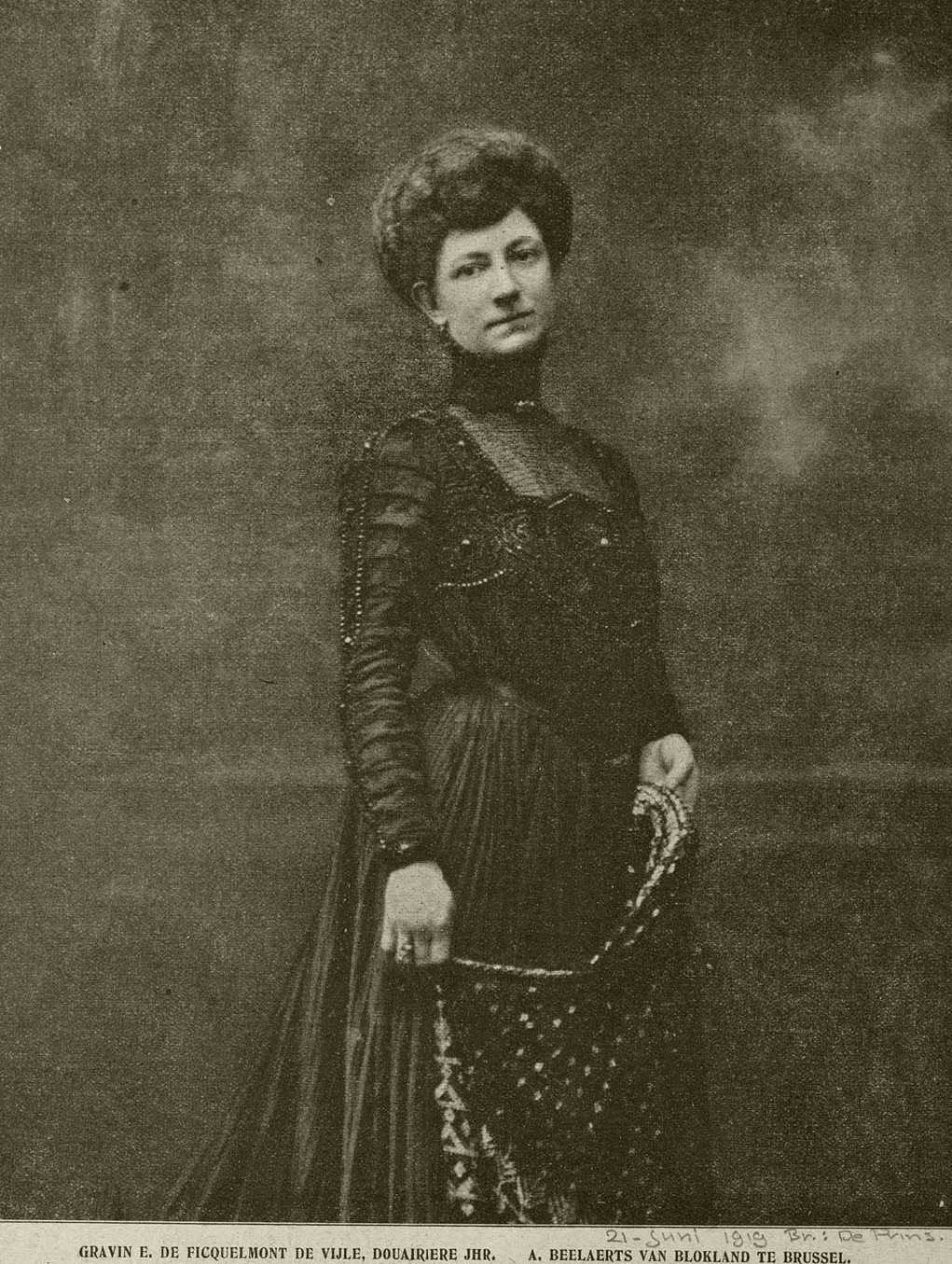
Countess Ficquelmont de Vyle

The last descendants of the Austrian branch had settled in what was Austrian Netherlands (nowadays Belgium) prior to the French Revolution. They had fled the country as it was occupied by the French during the French Revolutionary Wars then integrated into the Napoleon's Empire. But, following the fall of the First French Empire, the Austrian Netherlands became part of the United Kingdom of the Netherlands that had just been created by the Treaty of Vienna, and the Dutch Ficquelmonts returned to establish themselves in the newly founded kingdom. This branch had two lines:

- The first one, founded by count Antoine-Charles de Ficquelmont (1753-1833), who remained faithful to King William I of the Netherlands following the Belgian Revolution of 1830. That line is extinct since the early 20th century.
- The other line, founded by count Florimond Aloïs de Ficquelmont (1763-1818). His grandson took up Belgium nationality in 1884 and therefore entered the Belgian nobility.

== Titles ==
- Count von Ficquelmont (Austria 1736) (extinct)
- Reichsgraf von Ficquelmont personally granted to Jacques-Charles de Ficquelmont, colonel and Chambellan of the Holy Roman Empereur (extinct)
- Count van Ficquelmont (Netherlands 1822) for Antoine-Charles-Ignace de Ficquelmont (1753-1833) and his descendants in the Ficquelmont Family (extinct in 1899).
- Count van Ficquelmont (Netherlands 1822) for Florimond-Joseph-Ignace de Ficquelmont and his descendants in the Ficquelmont Family (extinct in 1948 in male line and in 1991 in female line).
- Count (Belgium 1855 for Charles Joseph de Ficquelmont de Vyle and his descendants in the Ficquelmont Family (extinct in 1948 in male line and in 1991 in female line).

Furthermore, the Ficquelmonts have been lords of Ficquelmonts, Puxe, la Tour en Voivre, Dieuze, Champcourt, Bathelémont, Flin and others lordships.

== Coat of arms ==
The blazon of this family coat of arms is: Or, gules three enhanced pickets, ensigned with a passant wolf sable.

The family's motto is "Nul ne m'atteint"

== Extinction of the Ficquelmont family in 1948 and 1991 ==
The Ficquelmont family and the title of count de Ficquelmont became extinct in male line in 1948 with Louis-Charles de Ficquelmont de Vyle and in the female line in 1991 with countess Ghislaine de Ficquelmont de Vyle, but the name "de Ficquelmont" was transmitted through adoption to Jean d'Albis who was adopted by the countess Ghislaine de Ficquelmont de Vyle and since used the name Jean d'Albis de Ficquelmont.

== See also ==
- Palais Ficquelmont

== Bibliography ==
- Charles Poplimont,La Belgique héraldique, volume IV, 1866, pages 225-232.
- Gustave Chaix d'Est-Ange, Dictionnaire des familles françaises anciennes ou notables à la fin du XIXe siècle., tome XVIII Fel-For. - 1922, pages 126-129.
- Henri Jougla de Morenas, Grand Armorial de France, tome III, 1935 page 289.
- Régis Valette, Catalogue de la noblesse française, Robert Laffont, Paris, 2007.
- Henri de Woelmont de Brumagne, Notices généalogiques, 7e série, page 340.
- Alain Petiot, Au service des Habsbourg, 1999
- Alain Petiot, Les Lorrains et l'Empire, 2005
