= Dorothea de Ficquelmont =

Russian writer and salonist (1804–1863)

- Countess de Ficquelmont
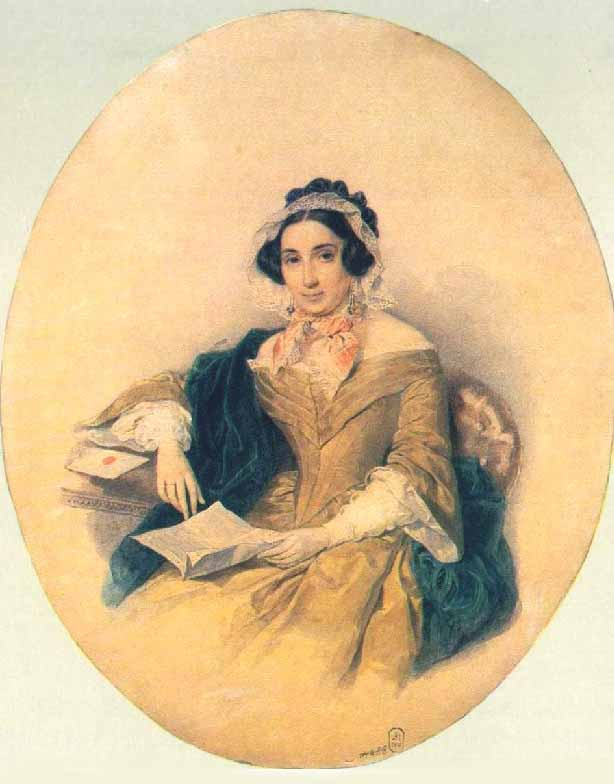
- Portrait by Pyotr Sokolov, 1837
- Born: Countess Dorothea von Tiesenhausen; 14 October 1804; Saint Petersburg, Russia
- Died: 10 April 1863 (aged 58); Venice, Austrian Empire
- Buried: Dubí
- Noble family: Tiesenhausen
- Spouse: Karl Ludwig von Ficquelmont
- Father: Ferdinand von Tiesenhausen
- Mother: Princess Elisabeth Koutouzova

Dorothea "Dolly" de Ficquelmont (Russian: Да́рья Фёдоровна Фикельмо́н, romanized: Darya Fyodorovna Fikelmon; 14 October 1804 – 10 April 1863), born Countess Dorothea von Tiesenhausen, was a Russian writer and salonist. A granddaughter of the Russian war hero Mikhail Kutuzov, she was a Russian aristocrat of German Baltic origin, and later a member of the Austrian nobility as the wife of Count Karl Ludwig von Ficquelmont.

== Biography ==
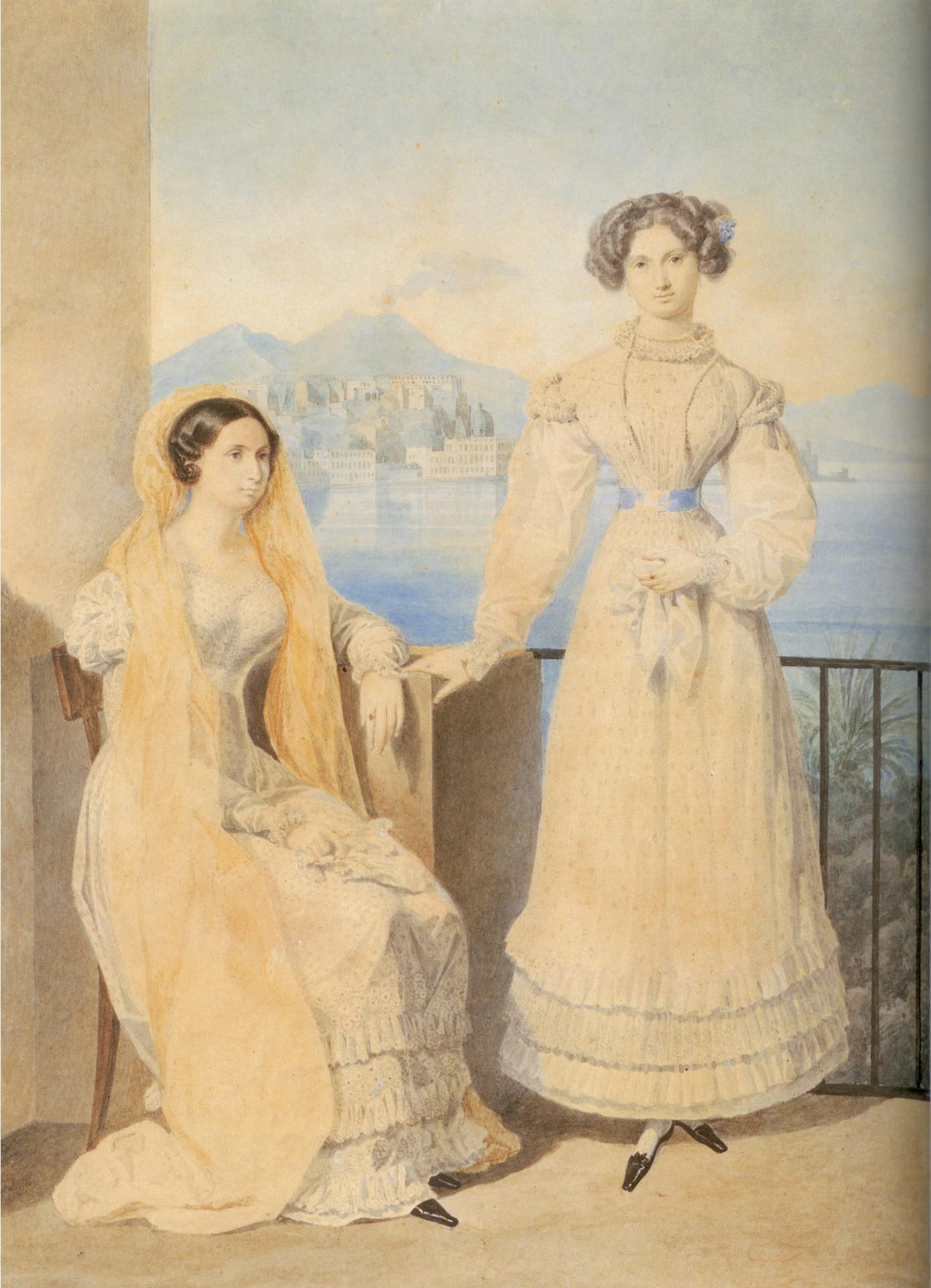
Countess Dolly de Ficquelmont and her sister Catherine, by Alexander Brullov

Dolly von Tiesenhausen was the daughter of Count Ferdinand von Tiesenhausen, aide-de-camp of Emperor Alexandre I of Russia who died at Austerlitz, and of Princess Elisabeth "Lisa" (sometimes "Elisa") Koutouzova, daughter of Prince Kutuzov. Her mother remarried in 1811 to Count Nicolas Khitrovo, Russian special envoy to the Grand Duchy of Tuscany. From 1815, Dolly von Tiesenhausen spent her childhood with her mother and her sister Catherine — future lady-in-waiting of the Imperial Court of Russia — in Reval, then moved to Florence where she spent the rest of her youth.

On 3 June 1821 she married Count Charles-Louis de Ficquelmont, Austrian Ambassador before the Habsbourgs-Tuscany, who was 27 years her senior. Following their marriage, the Count was appointed Ambassador to the Court of King Ferdinand I of Two Sicilies in Naples. In spite of the revolutionary troubles in the Kingdom of Two Sicilies and the increasing tensions between Austria and Naples, the Ficquelmonts perfectly integrated into Naples' aristocratic high society.

In 1823, the Ficquelmonts travelled to Saint Petersburg. Emperor Alexander offered her mother, Princess Elisabeth, an imperial pension and the family was often seen at Court.

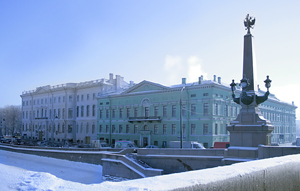
View of Saltykov Mansion

Back in Naples in 1825, Dolly gave birth to her only daughter, Elisabeth-Alexandrine-Marie-Theresa de Ficquelmont, Princess of Clary und Aldringen by marriage.

In 1829, Dolly's husband was appointed Austrian Ambassador in Russia. The Saltykov Mansion was rented by the Austrian Government as the Austrian Embassy. Dolly's mother, Elisabeth Khitrovo had her own apartments in the palace and held a salon. Countess Ficquelmont, who took great interest in literature, philosophy, religion and politics, also held her own salon. Alexander Turgenev, Viazemski or Ivan Kozlov were regulars of the countess's salon. Alexander Pushkin was often seen in Ficquelmont's salon which was described by Prince Wiazemsky as "a place of wisdom and intelligence".

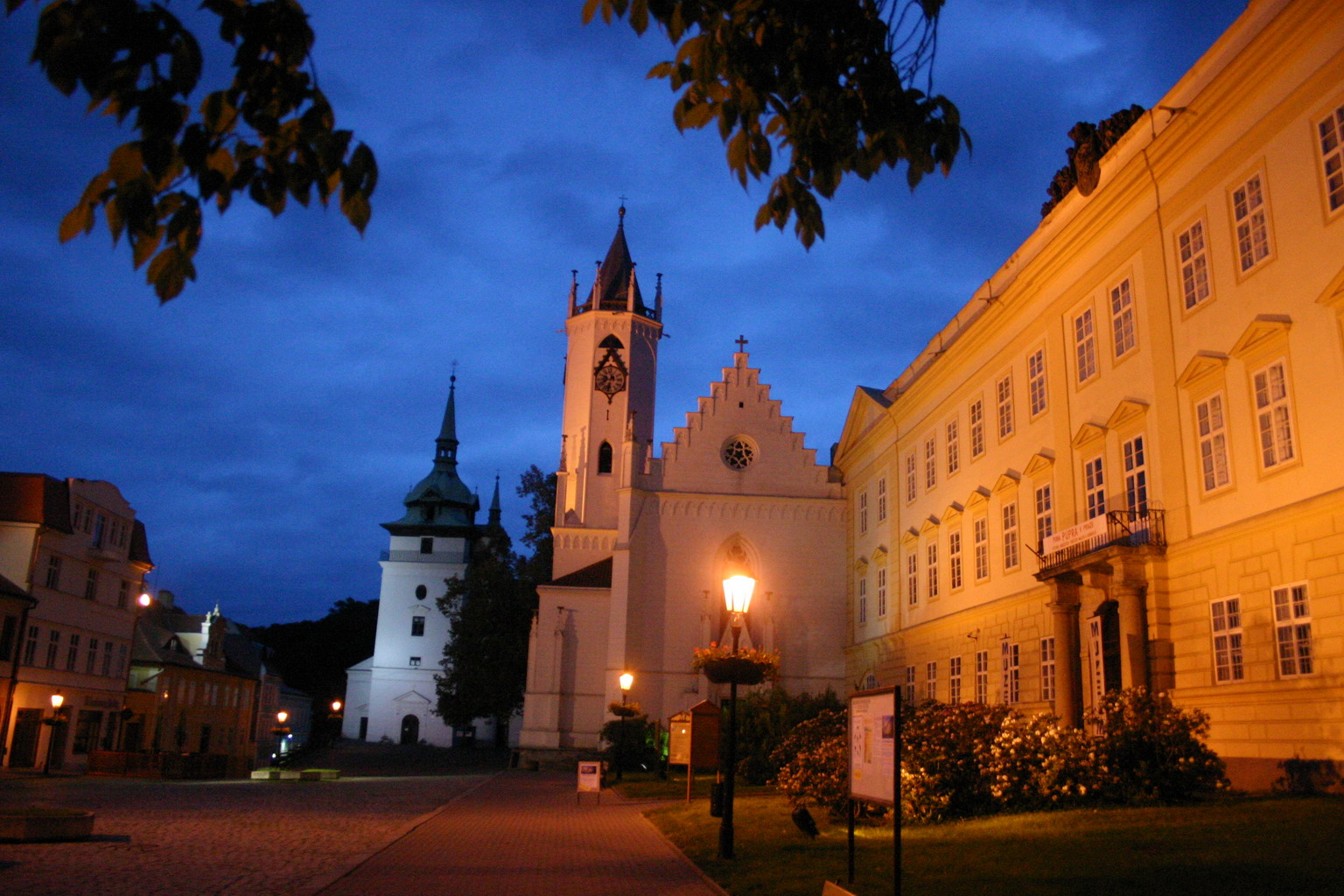
Teplice Castle

In 1839 her husband was recalled to Vienna to assume the duties of the Foreign Office, so the Ficquelmonts left Russia. During her remaining years, Dolly essentially lived between their palaces of Vienna and Venice and their daughter's castle in Teplice.

Her husband, Count de Ficquelmont became Minister-President of the Empire during the 1848's revolutionary troubles. But, close ally of Russia, he was accused of supporting the Russian repression. The Countess, who was at their Venice's Palace at the time, was arrested twice by the Venetian guarda civil and finally had to leave the city on board an English ship with her daughter, son-in-law and grandchildren.

The family eventually returned to Venice after the Revolution ended and Count de Ficquelmont died in their Venetian Palace in 1857.

After her husband's death, Dolly continued writing her correspondence and organized it in order to publish it. It is mostly made up of philosophy and political thoughts. She also wrote a Journal in French that was published in 1950 in Italian and Russian. The St. Petersburg's period had been closely studied by historian Antony Florovski (1884–1968).

Countess Dolly de Ficquelmont is buried in Princess Clary und Aldringen's family chapel in Dubí, near Teplice.

== In fiction ==
Countess de Ficquelmont met Alexander Pushkin during fall 1829 and often invited him to her Saint Petersburg Palace. They became friends. Ficquelmont's palace is believed to be the frame for the old Countess' palace in Pushkin's story The Queen of Spades.

== See also ==
- Family von Tiesenhausen
- Family de Ficquelmont

== Sources ==
- Фикельмон, Дарья Федоровна
- М. И. Гиллельсон. Пушкин в итальянском издании дневника Д. Ф. Фикельмон
