= Émile Friant =

French artist (1863–1932)

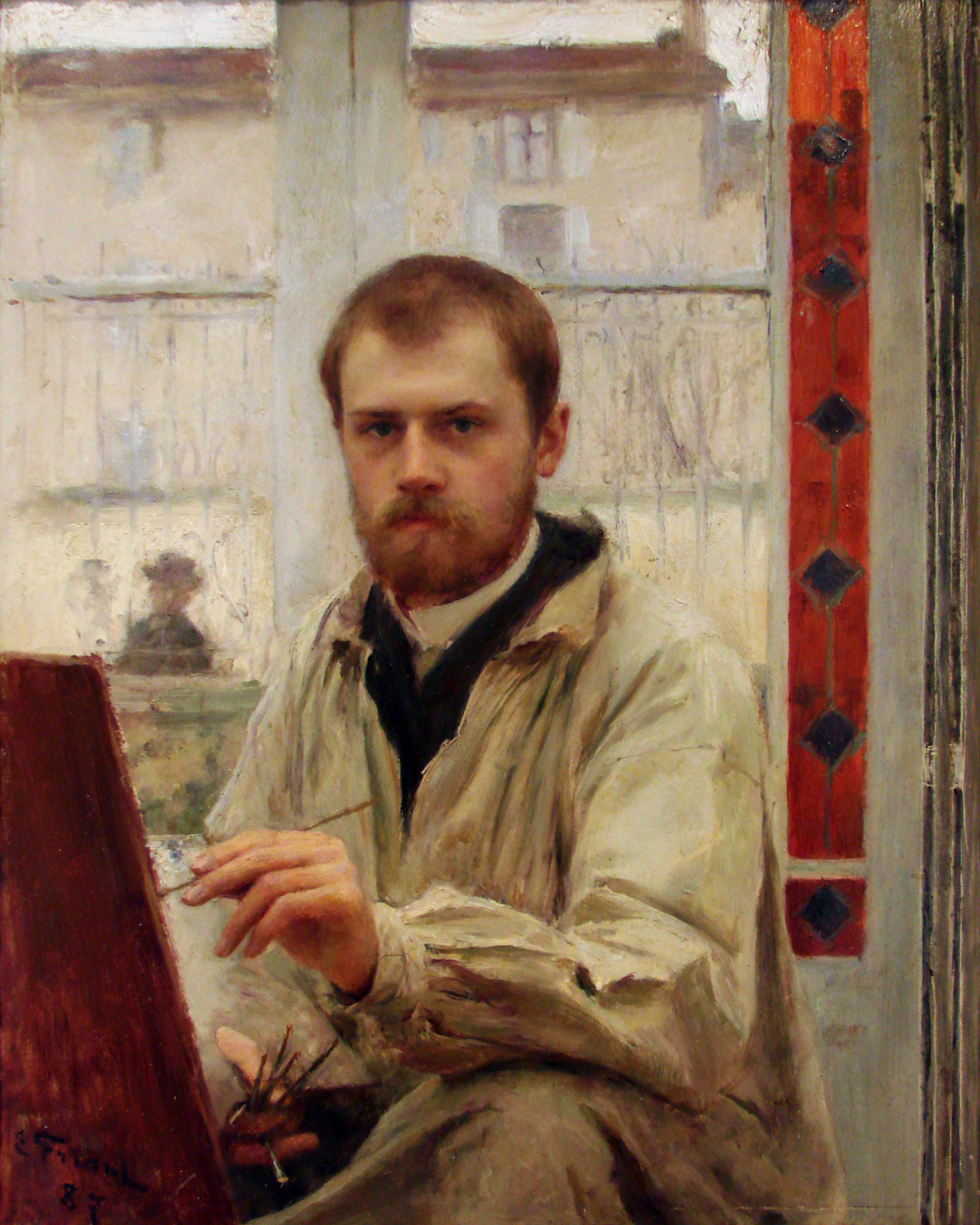
- Self-portrait, 1887
- Born: 16 April 1863; Dieuze, France
- Died: 9 June 1932 (aged 69); Paris, France
- Known for: Painting, drawing
- Movement: Realism

Émile Friant (French: [emil fʁijɑ̃]; 16 April 1863 – 9 June 1932) was a French artist. Born in the commune of Dieuze, he exhibited paintings throughout his lifetime at the Paris Salon. He served as a professor of painting at the École des Beaux-Arts, and was awarded the position of commander in the Legion of Honour, and was made a member of the Institut de France.

Friant created works in charcoal, oil, and other media. He also used photographs to prepare finished paintings.

== Early life ==
Friant was born in the commune of Dieuze in 1863. His father was a locksmith and mother a dressmaker. Madame Parisot, the wife of a local chemist, often hired Friant's mother to design custom clothing. The Parisots took an early interest in the young Friant and treated him maternally, as they were without children of their own.

In 1870, with the defeat of the Second French Empire at hand as part of the then-ongoing Franco-Prussian War, annexation of Alsatia occurred and Dieuze was no longer under French state control. Intensely distressed by this, Monsieur Parisot intended to leave the commune for Nancy, but died shortly before having the chance. In 1871, Madame Parisot fled with Friant to Nancy; his biological family would follow later.

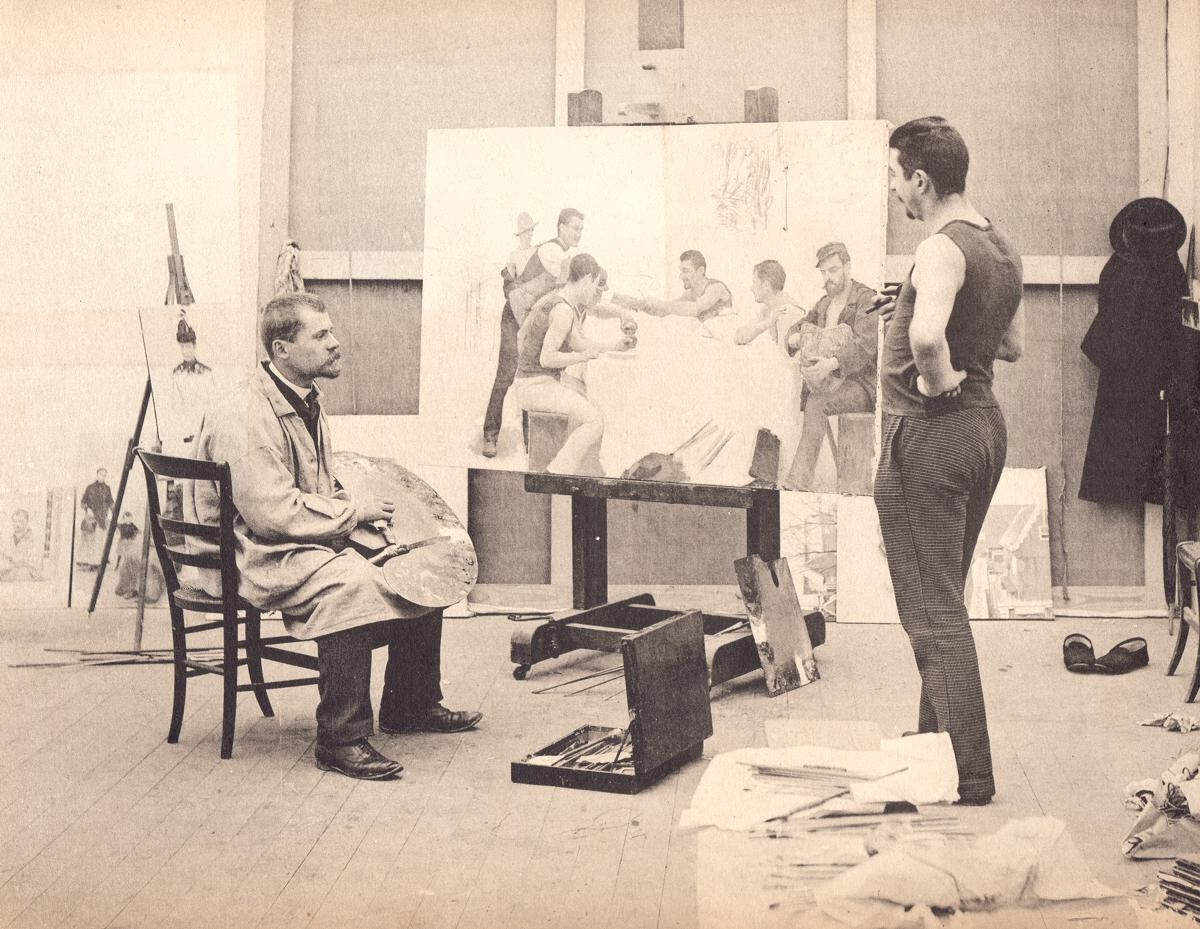
Studio of Emile Friant, around 1887

Friant was sent to the lycée to learn Latin, as Madame Parisot intended for him to follow in her husband's footsteps and become a chemist. Meanwhile, friends of his biological father had suggested sending him to a municipal school of art because of his skill with the brush. Because of his poor performance at the lycée, Friant requested permission to leave and focus on his art. His father agreed, and the young Friant was placed under the guide of a private tutor who would arrange his academic work so that time remained for painting. Under the guidance of Louis-Théodore Devilly, director of a school in Nancy and a proponent of realism, Friant learned the art of still life and landscape painting.

Friant painted a self-portrait at the age of 15. When it was exhibited in the Salon des Amis des Arts in Nancy he was referred to as Le petit Friant and quickly became the center of public intrigue. The municipal council granted him permission to travel to Paris a year later. There, he studied under Alexandre Cabanel, who tutored him in creating oil sketches of historical works. Friant, becoming disenchanted by the academic style of the atelier method, returned to Nancy where he worked with the painter Aimé Morot.

== The Salon ==
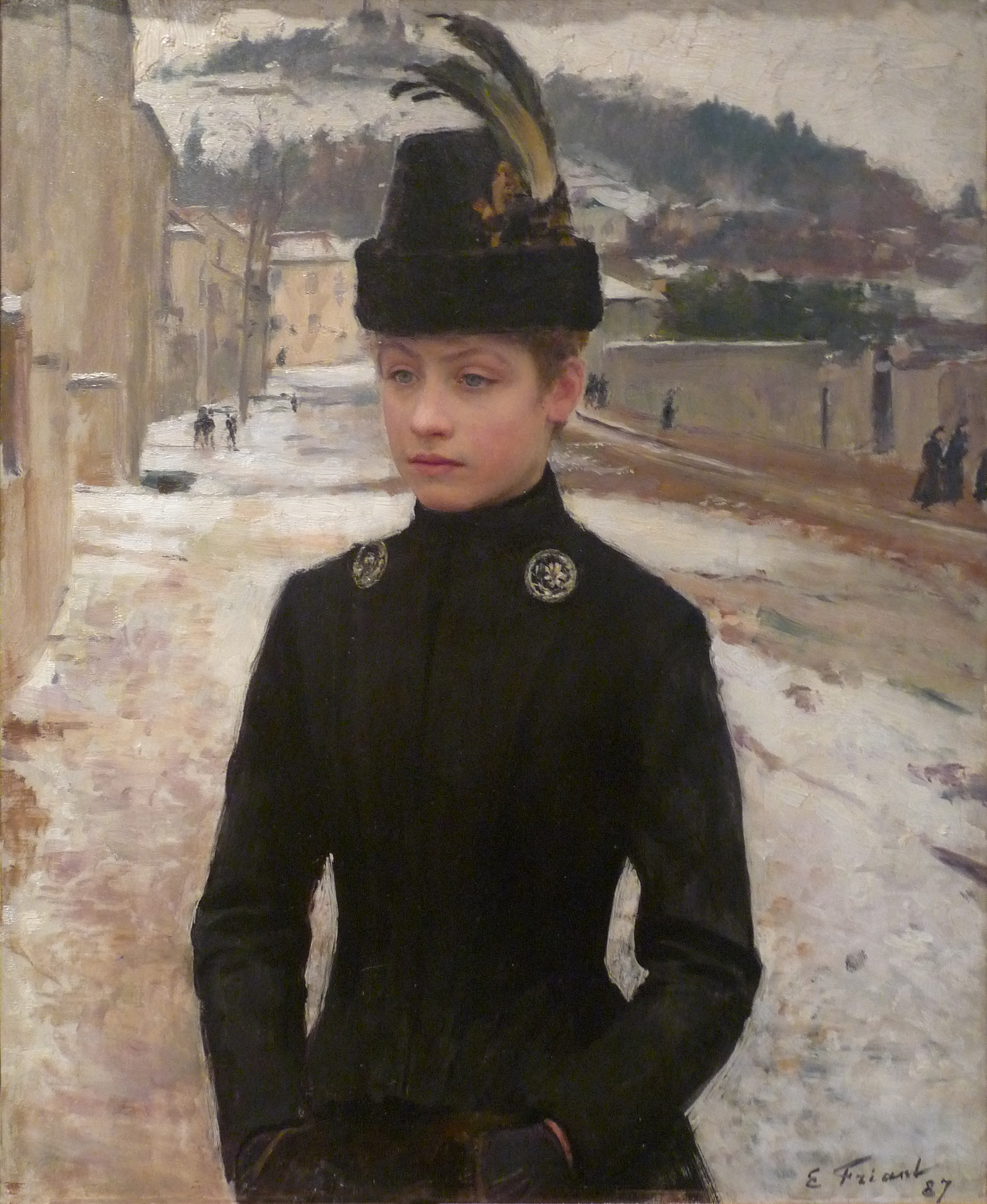
Young lady from Nancy in snow landscape, 1887. Musée des beaux-arts, Nancy

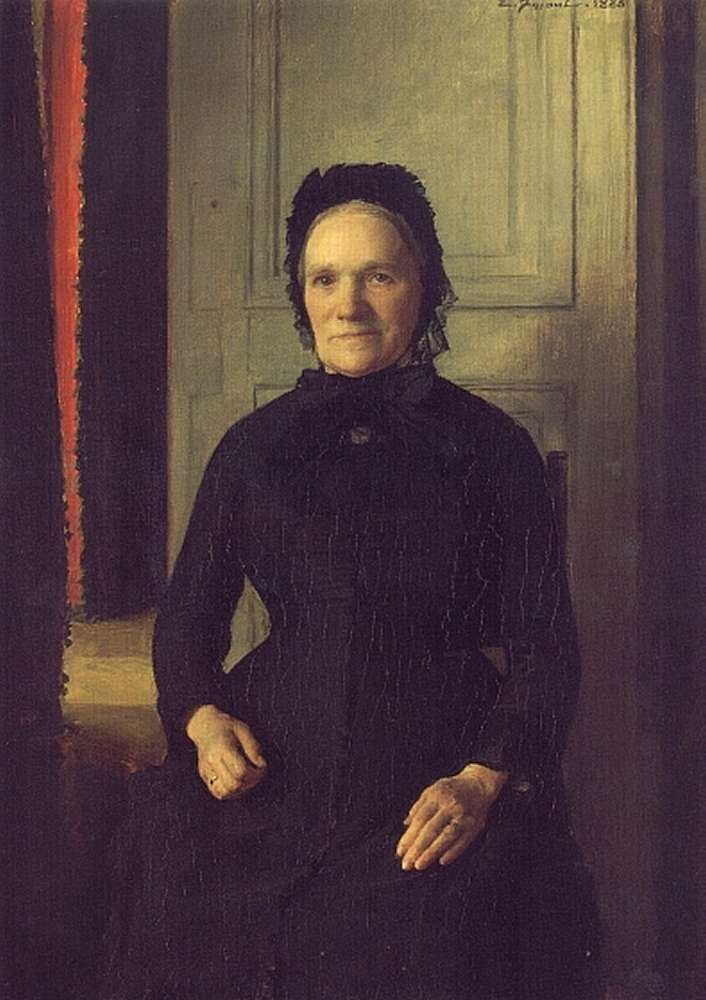
Madame Coquelin Mère

In 1882, Aimé Morot encouraged him to debut two of his works at the Salon: The Prodigal Son and Studio Interior, for which he received an honourable mention. The following year, Friant again presented at the Salon and took second place in the Prix de Rome concours. In 1884 he received a third class medal at the Salon with his painting Un coin d'atelier and in 1885 a second-class medal. He would form a lasting friendship with the actors Ernest and Benoit Coquelin. With the travel grant he received from the Salon of 1886, Friant traveled to and studied in the Netherlands. His portrait of the Coquelins' mother reflects the influence of that trip. In 1889 he exhibited his 1888 painting La Toussaint at the Salon, for which he received a first prize. This painting depicts a revanchist patriotic image of a group of people visiting a cemetery in which the French victims of the Franco-Prussian War were buried. He received a gold medal for the same painting at the Universal Exposition of 1889, as well as the Legion of Honour. The painting was acquired by the State and added to the collection of the Luxembourg and is now on permanent display in the Musée des beaux-arts in Nancy. He received a second gold medal from the jury at the Universal Exposition in 1900, where he exhibited five paintings including La Discussion politique, Jours heureux and La Douleur.

== Later life ==
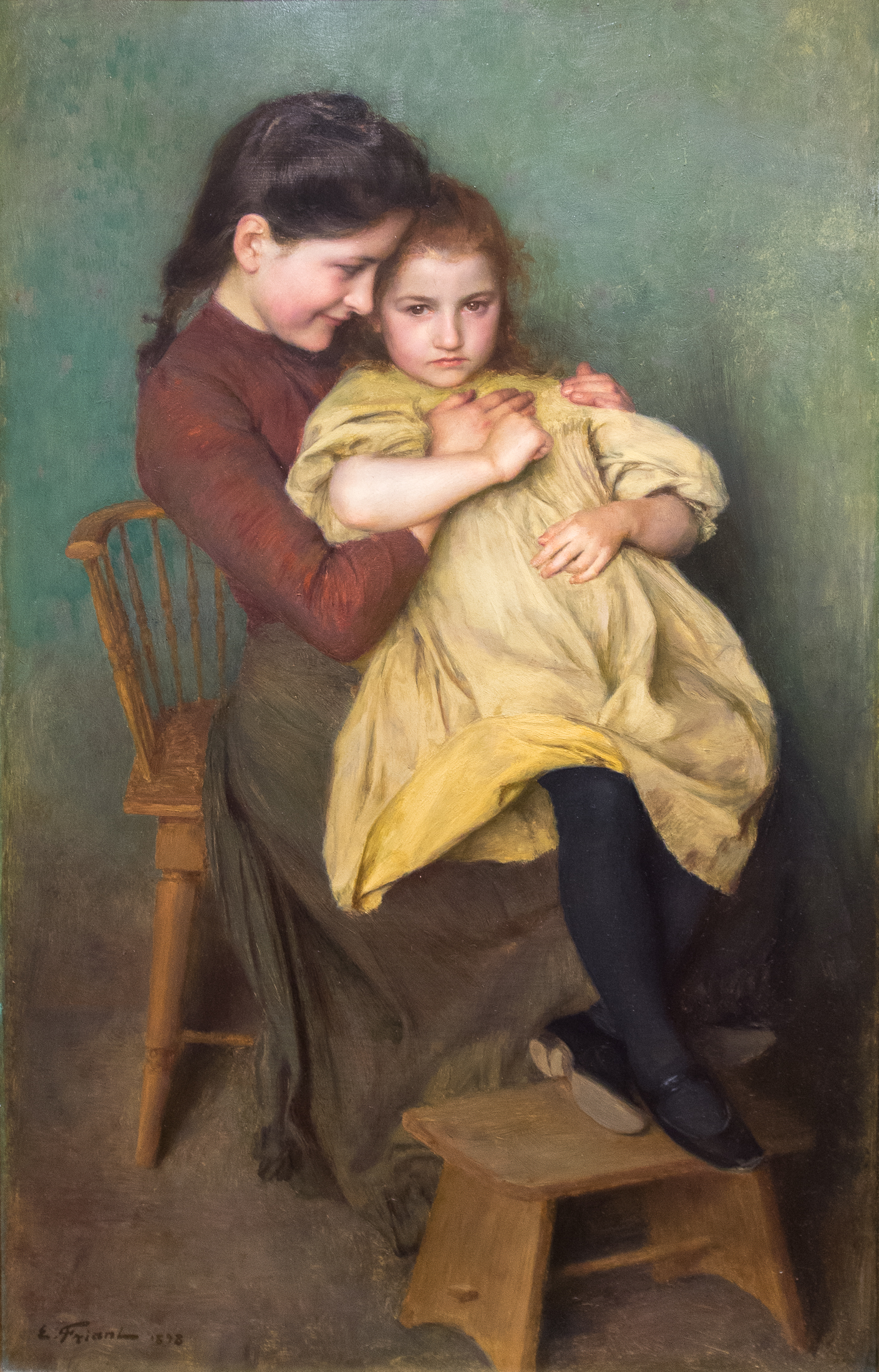
Chagrin d'Enfant, 1898, Frick Art & Historical Center

Friant was appointed a professor of painting in 1923 at the École des Beaux-Arts in Paris, France, promoted to the position of commander in the Legion of Honour, and made a member of the Institut de France. In 1930 the art critic Arsène Alexandre published a comprehensive review of the art of Friant. In 1932, Friant fell to his death in Paris. He was buried at the Préville Cemetery in Nancy.

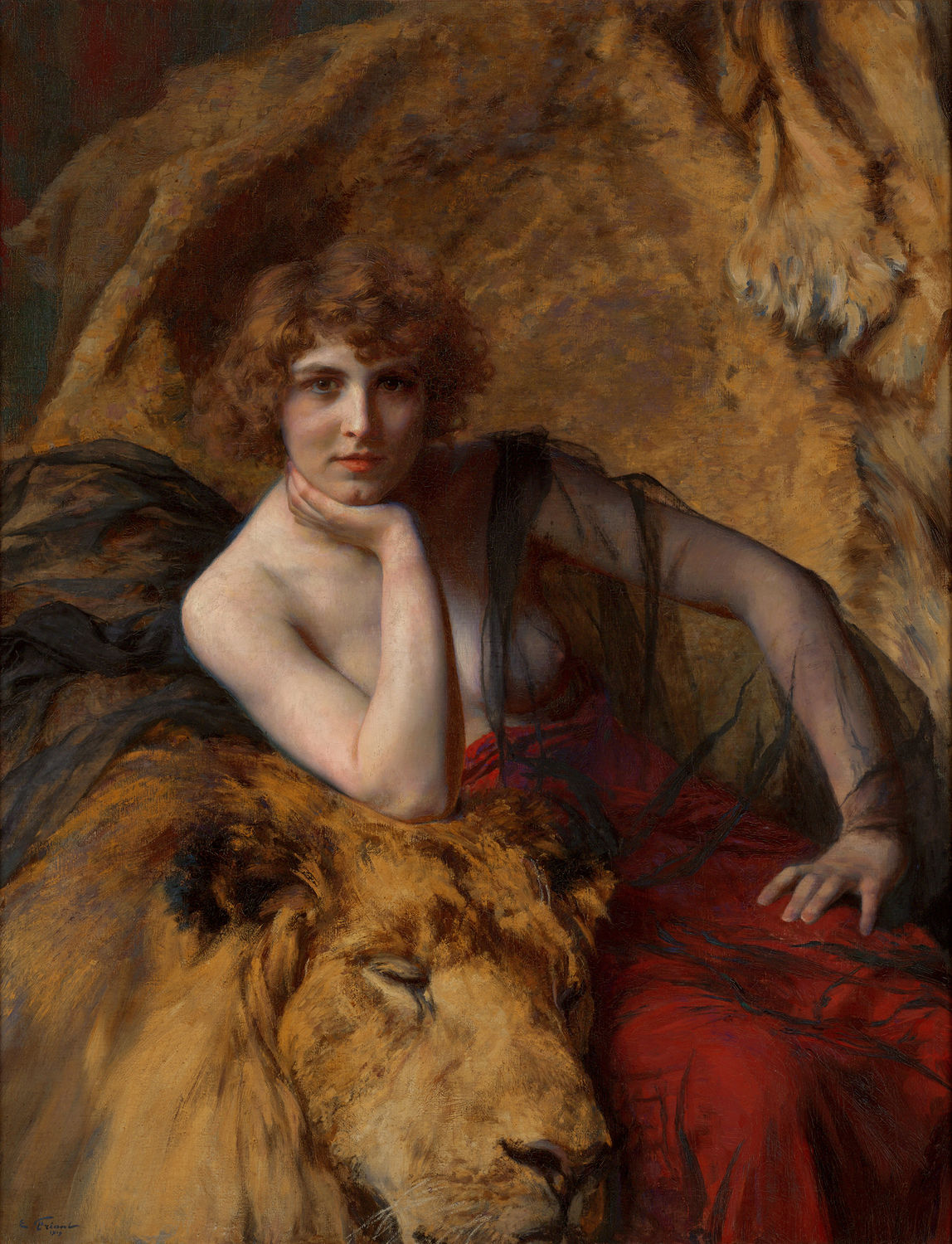
Lady and the Lion, 1919

== Paintings ==
- Le travail du lundi, 1884. Oil on wood panel. Musée des beaux-arts de Nancy, France.
- Auto-portrait, 1885. Oil on panel. Musée des beaux-arts de Nancy, France.
- Jeune Nancéienne dans une paysage de neige (Young lady from Nancy in snow landscape), 1887. Oil on canvas, 46 x 37 cm. Musée des beaux-arts de Nancy, France.
- Les Canotiers de la Meurthe (The Meurthe boating party), 1887. Musée de l'École de Nancy, France.
- La Toussaint (All Saints' Day), 1888. Oil on canvas, 254 x 334 cm. Musée des beaux-arts de Nancy, France.
- La discussion politique (political discussion), 1889. Oil on canvas.
- La Lutte (The fight), 1889. Oil on canvas. Musée Fabre, France.
- Ombres portées (Cast shadows), 1891. Oil on canvas. Musée d'Orsay, Paris, France.
- The Frugal Repast, 1894.
- Par lui-même (self-portrait). 1895. Oil on wood panel. Musée des beaux-arts de Nancy, France.
- La douleur (The sorrow), 1898. Oil on canvas. Musée des beaux-arts de Nancy, France.
- Femme avec un lion (Lady with lion).
- Portrait de M. Émile Hinzelin, 1908. Musée d'art moderne et contemporain, Strasbourg, France.
- L'echo de la Forêt, Petit Palais, Paris, France. Exposed at the Salon de la Société nationale des Beaux-Arts, 1911.
- Guillaume Dubufe (1835-1909) à son chevalet, no date. Musée d'Orsay, Paris, France.
- L'oiseau blessé, date unknown. Exhibited at the Salon de Paris.
- Les Amoureux, Nancy, Musée des Beaux-Arts
- Marie Marvingt and her proposed air ambulance, 1914. Drawing on paper.
- Portrait de Jean Scherbeck, 1929. Drawing on paper.

== Bibliography ==
- Hamerton, Philip Gilbert (1 December 1894), Types Of Contemporary Painting. XII. Cast Shadows, By Emile Friant, vol. 16, Scribner's Magazine, archived from the original on March 3, 2016
- McIntosh, DeCourcy E (1 April 1997). "Emile Friant: a forgotten realist of the gilded age". The Magazine Antiques.
- Thomson, Richard (2004), The Troubled Republic, Yale University Press, ISBN 978-0-300-10465-3
