= Tiesenhausen =

Baltic German noble family

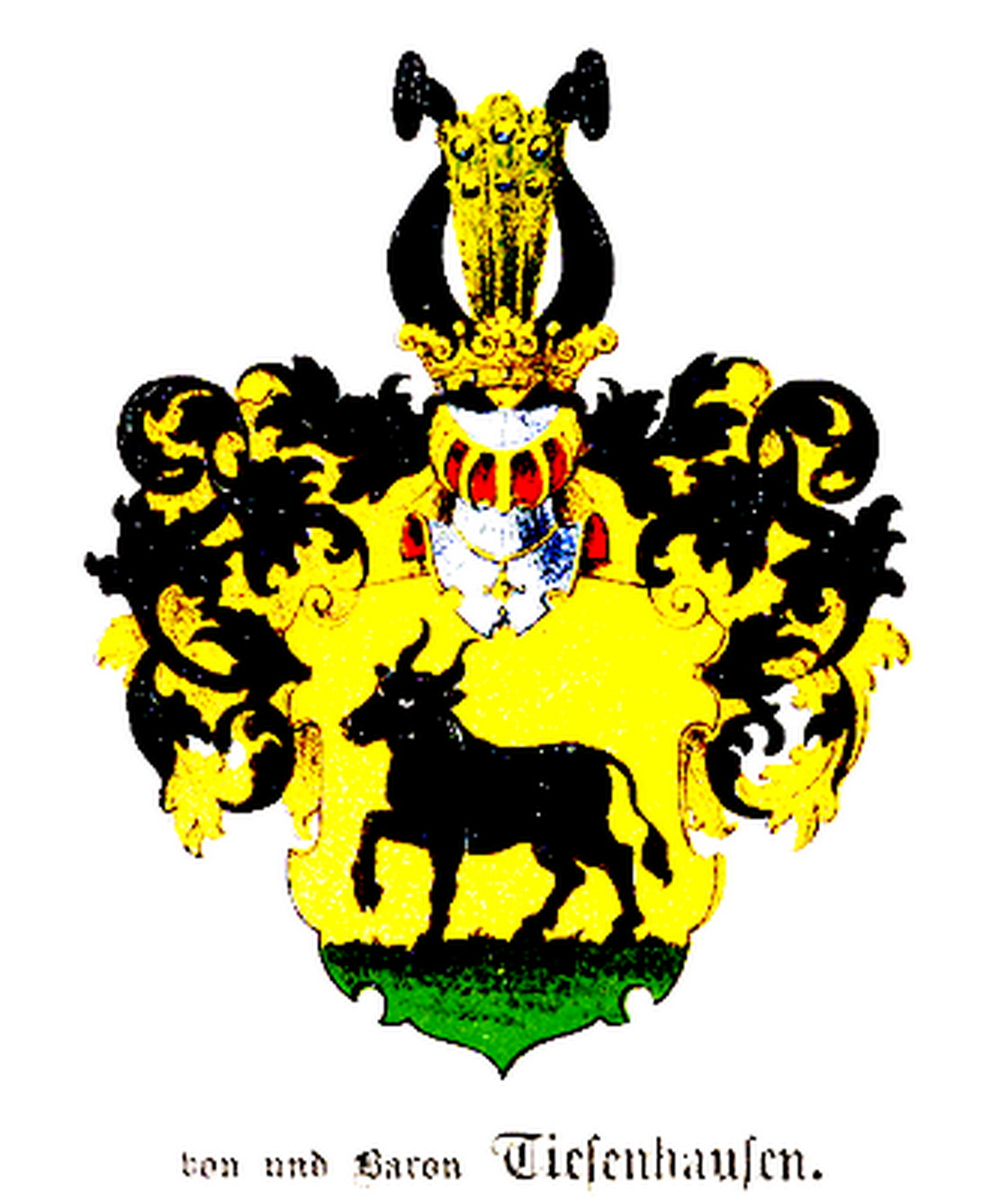
Tiesenhausen's Blazon

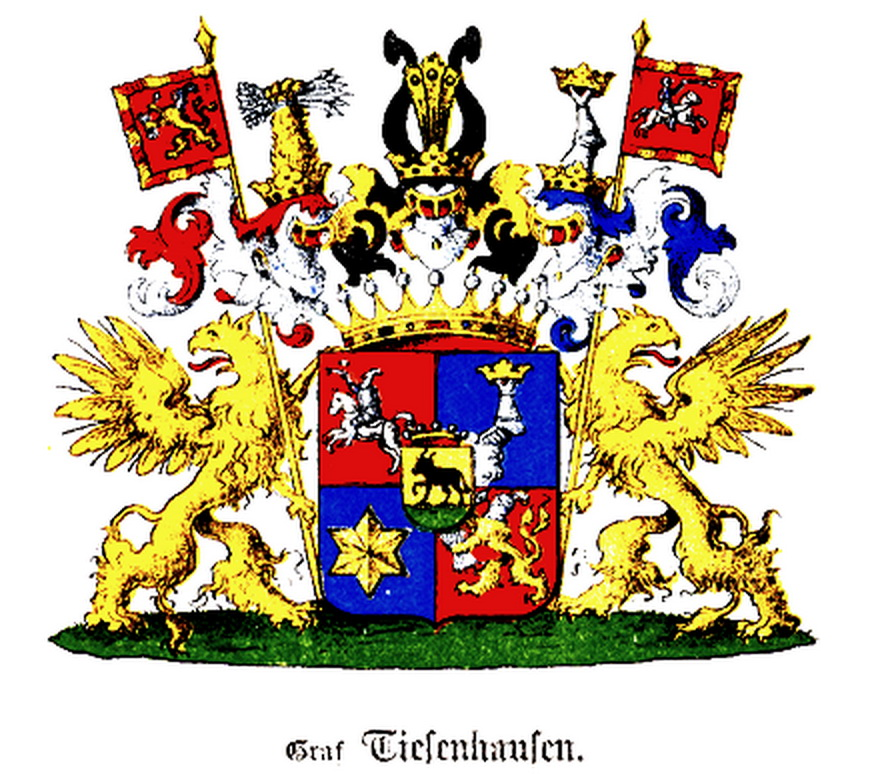
Counts von Tiesenhausen's coat of arms

The House of Tiesenhausen is an old Baltic-German noble family. The origins of the family are in Lower Saxony. During the Baltic crusades they settled in Livonia in the first half of the 13th century. Bishops Albert of Riga and Herman of Tartu had a sister whose husband Engelbertus de Tisenhuse was the progenitor of the family in the Baltic. After some time in southern Livonia in the early stages of occupation, Engelbertus joined his brother-in-law bishop Herman to obtain the northern Livonian country of Ugaunia around Otepää and Tartu. It was Ugaunia where the family held its main early properties and positions. Engelbertus' son married a daughter of the castellan of Koknese in Latgale and through this marriage, the family claims descent from indigenous princes of the Latgalians. Some branches of Tisenhusen clan settled later to the Latvian Vidzeme holdings of Ērgļi and Bērzaune. From the ancestral place of Ugaunia, sons of the family managed to obtain estates in other parts of Estonia, also so-called Danish Estonia and Osilia-Rotalia, both by services and by marriages. (Raplamaa was apparently a favorite place in northern Estonia for them to obtain estates.)

In Livonia they became one of the wealthiest and most important noble lineages between the 14th and 16th centuries. During the changeful history of Livonia several members of the family served under various suzerains, first under the Livonian Brothers of the Sword and the Teutonic Knights and later in Polish–Lithuanian Commonwealth ("Tyzenhauz"), Swedish and Tsarist Russian ("Тизенгаузен") service.

== Notable members ==
- Ferdinand von Tiesenhausen (1782–1805), Russian military officer whose death in Austerlitz inspired Tolstoi's character Andrei Bolkonsky in "War and Peace"
- Dorothea von Tiesenhausen (1804–1863), Countess de Ficquelmont by marriage, famous for her letter-writing telling her life as a high society aristocrat in 19th century's Europe
- Gerhard von Tiesenhausen (1878–1917), Baltic-German architect in Russia
- Hans-Diedrich von Tiesenhausen (1913–2000), U-boat captain
- Georg von Tiesenhausen (1914–2018), German-American rocket scientist.

== Estates ==
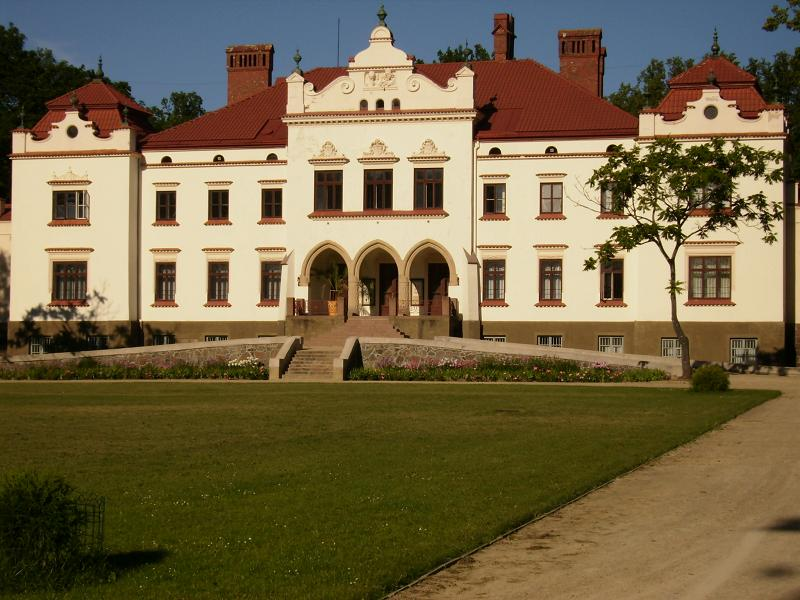
Rokiškis Castle

- Rapla Manor (Rappel), in Rapla, Estonia
- Alu Manor (Allo), near Rapla
- Valtu Manor (Waldau), near Rapla (was destroyed during the Revolution of 1905)
- Hertu Manor (Hermet), near Rapla
- Castle of Fall (Schloß Fall), in Keila-Joa, Estonia
- Sausti Manor (Groß-Sauß), Estonia
- Rokiškis Manor (Rokischken Castle), in Rokiškis, Lithuania (see picture above)
- Lubēja Manor (Gut Lubey), Latvia
