= Saltykov Mansion =

Palace in Saint Petersburg, Russia

Coordinates: 59°56′46″N 30°19′50″E

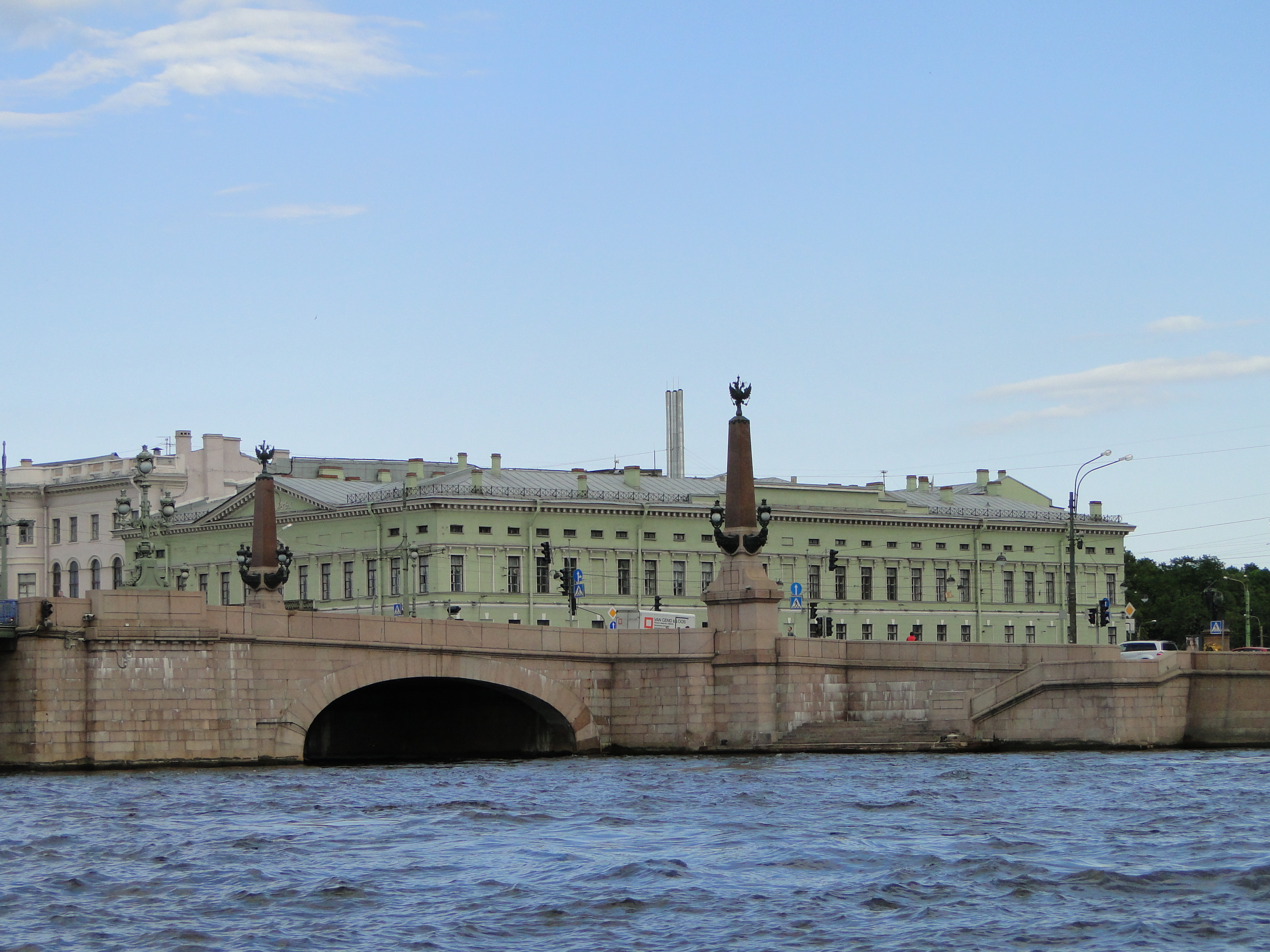
View from across the Trinity Bridge

The Saltykov Mansion (дом Салтыкова, особняк Салтыкова, Palais Soltikoff) is a Neoclassical palace situated between Palace Embankment and Millionnaya Street in Saint Petersburg, Russia. It was built to the design of Giacomo Quarenghi in the 1780s. A few months before her death, Catherine the Great presented the edifice to Prince Nikolai Saltykov, the tutor of her eldest grandsons.

== History ==
Catherine the Great initially granted the land to her personal secretary Pyotr Soimonov who soon sold it to the merchant Philipp Grootten (1748-1815). The latter asked Giacomo Quarenghi to build him the mansion whose neo-classical façade can still be seen from across the Neva.

In 1793 Grootten sold the mansion to another merchant, Thomas Sievers, who sold it on to Princess Ekaterina Petrovna Bariatynskaia.

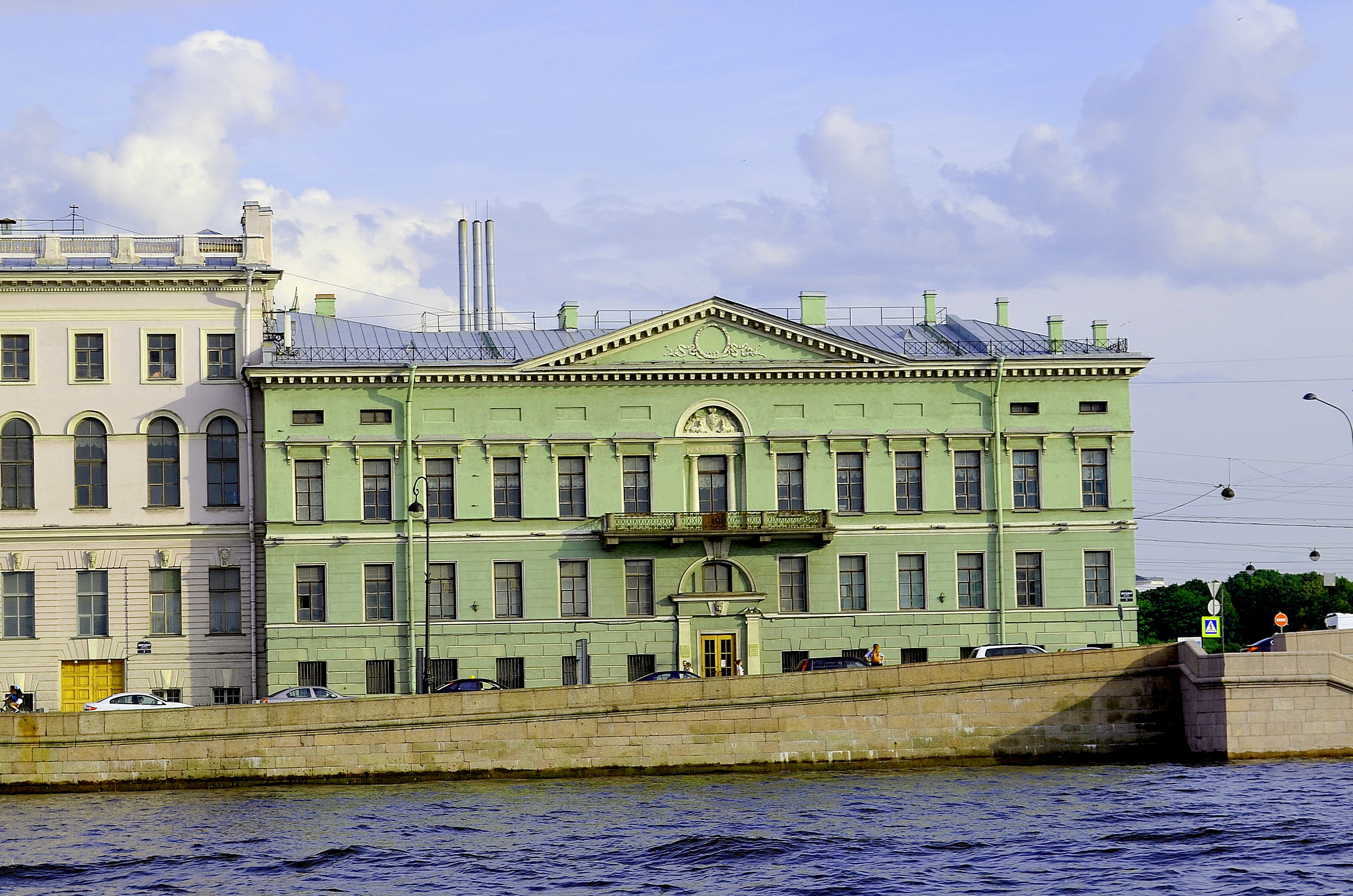
The Neva frontage

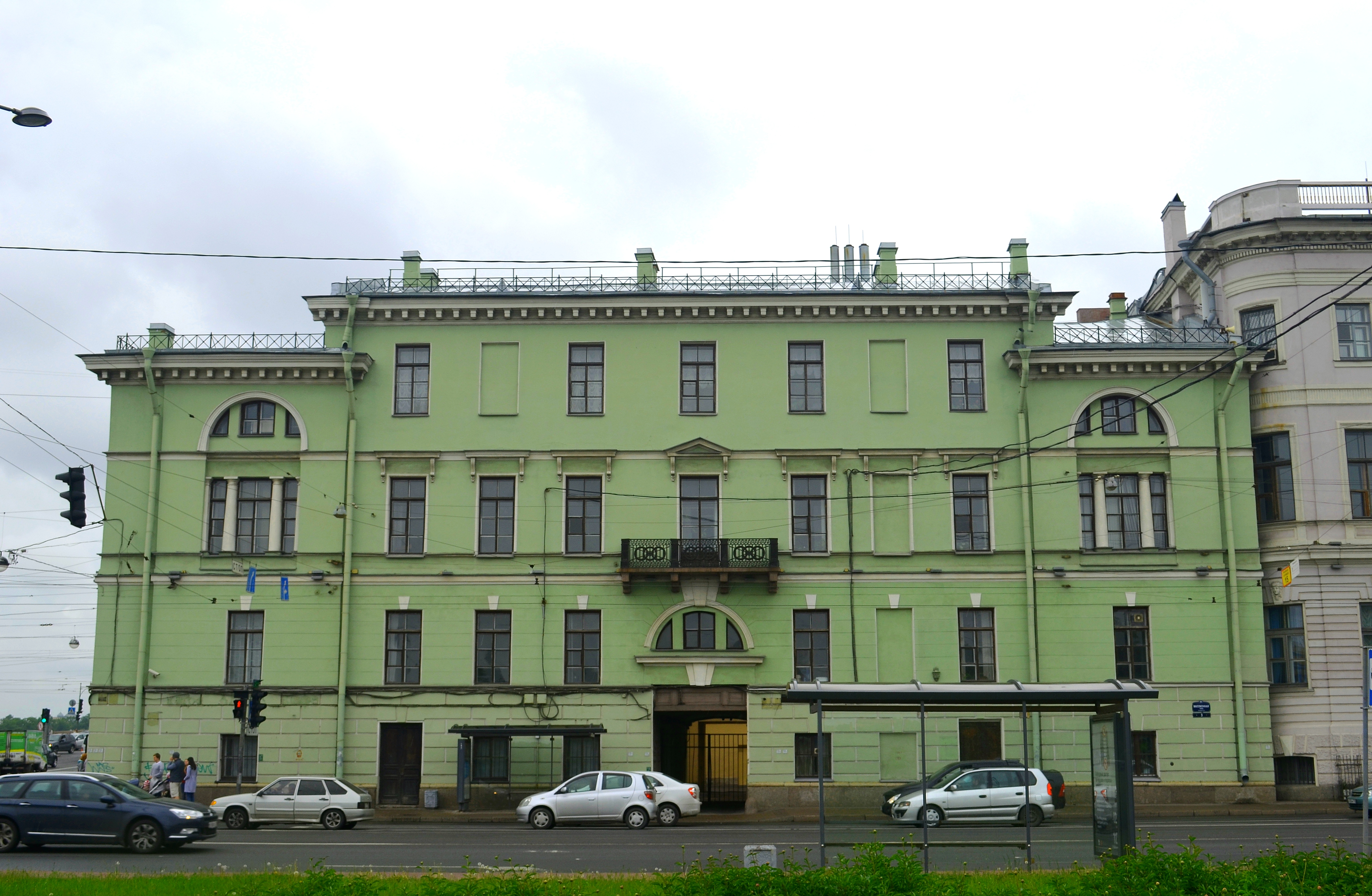
The opposite (South) façade

In 1796, the mansion became the property of Count (later Prince) Nikolai Saltykov (Nicholas Soltikoff), the interim head of the Sovereign Military Order of Malta. For more than a century (from 1796 to 1918) the mansion remained the property of the Saltykov family.

In 1828 the Saltykovs rented the mansion out fully furnished. It was leased by the Austrian government as its embassy in the Russian capital. From September 1831, for a period of eleven years the Saltykov Mansion was the residence of the Austrian ambassador Charles-Louis de Ficquelmont (1777-1857).

The Saltykov Mansion became the venue for two of the most famous salons of the period: in the evenings the one hosted by Filquemont's wife Dolly (1804-1863) and in the mornings another hosted by her mother Elisabeth Khitrovo (Kutuzov's daughter). The Count was recalled to Vienna in 1840, but the Austrian government continued to rent the Saltykov Mansion until 1855.

Later, the second and the third floors were rented by the Danish diplomat Otten Plessen. In 1863, the British government leased the Saltykov Mansion and it became the British Embassy until 1918.

== Architecture ==
The Saltykov Mansion is situated in central Saint Petersburg. It stands on Suvorov Square by Trinity Bridge between the south bank of the Neva and the Field of Mars. Its official address is 4, Palace Embankment. The building fronts Palace Embankment and has its back on Millionnaya Street. Water frontage on the Neva was highly prized by the Russian aristocracy, while Millionnaya Street was considered one of the Russian Empire's grandest addresses.

The façade is a remarkable example of Palladian architecture in Russia. This style, imported by foreign architects, especially during the reign of Empress Catherine II, had become very fashionable with Russian nobility by the 1780s when the mansion was built.

The façade is shaped with great simplicity, combining harmonic proportions and moderate ornamentation that highlight few decorative elements, such as the piano nobile balcony facing the Neva and the palace's pediments.

== Sources ==
- Simon Dixon, Personality and Place in Russian Culture, MHRA, 2010, pages 331 à 335.
