= Hertu =

Village in Estonia

Coordinates: 58°58′N 24°53′E

- Village
- Interactive map of Hertu
- Country: Estonia
- County: Rapla County
- Parish: Kehtna Parish
- Time zone: UTC+2 (EET)
  - Summer (DST): UTC+3 (EEST)

Hertu is a village in Kehtna Parish, Rapla County in northern-central Estonia.
