= Karl Ludwig von Ficquelmont =

Austrian aristocrat, statesman and Cavalry General

Erlaucht Karl Ludwig Graf von Ficquelmont
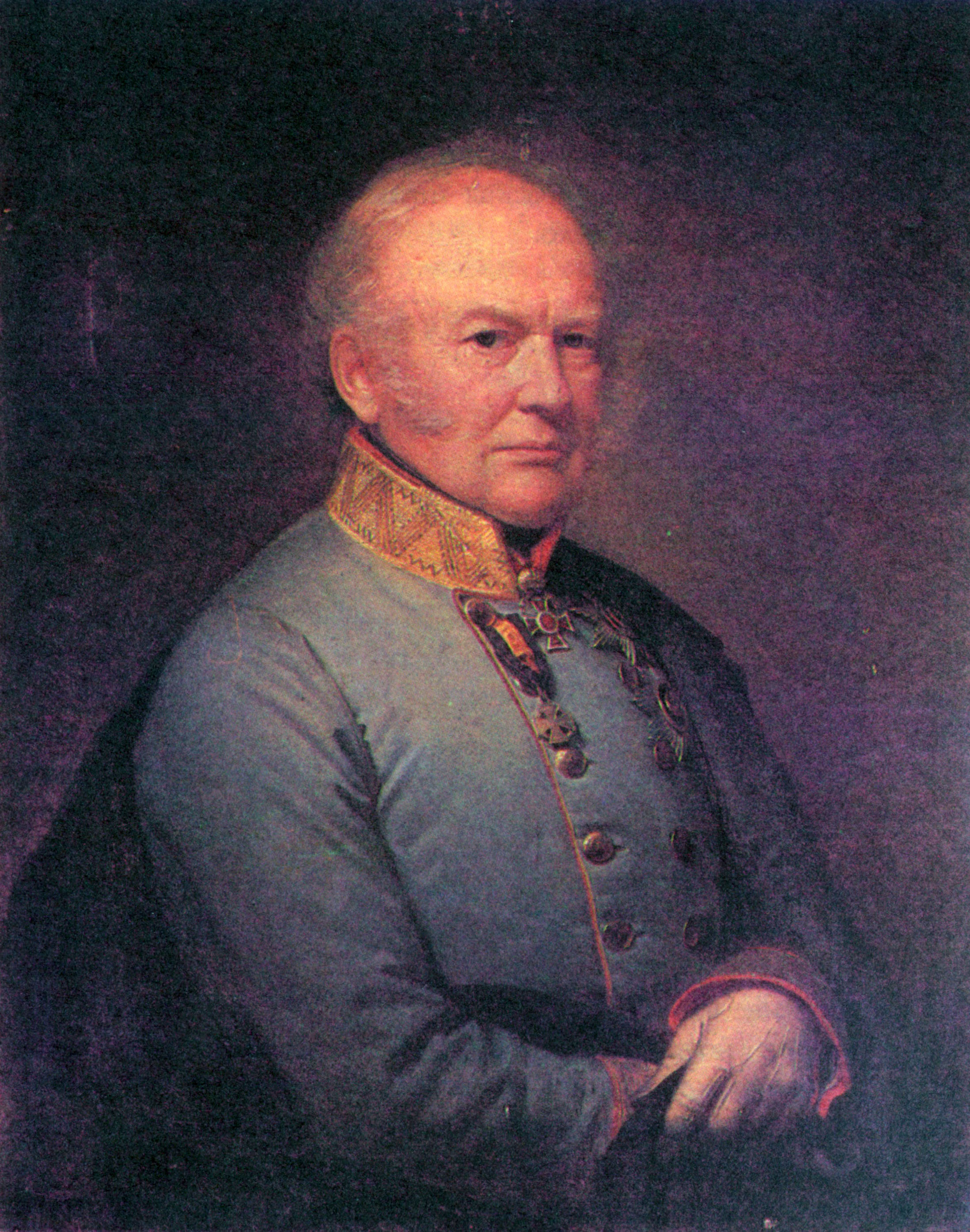
- Portrait by Anton Einsle, 1838

Minister-President of the Austrian Empire
- In office 4 April 1848 – 4 May 1848
- Monarch: Ferdinand I
- Preceded by: Count Franz Anton von Kolowrat-Liebsteinsky
- Succeeded by: Baron Franz von Pillersdorf

Foreign Minister of the Austrian Empire
- In office 18 March 1848 – 4 May 1848
- Monarch: Ferdinand I
- Preceded by: Klemens Fürst von Metternich
- Succeeded by: Johann Freiherr von Wessenberg-Ampringen

Personal details
- Born: 23 March 1777 Castle of Dieuze, Lorraine, France
- Died: 7 April 1857 (aged 80) Venice, Lombardy–Venetia, Austrian Empire
- Spouse: Dorothea Fürstin von Tiesenhausen
- Relations: Maximilien-Chrétien, Count de Ficquelmont and of the Holy Empire; Anne Marie, Countess Treusch von Buttlar (parents)
- Children: Elisabeth-Alexandrine de Ficquelmont, princess Clary-und-Aldringen

Karl Ludwig, Count of Ficquelmont (German: [ˈfɪkɛlˌmɔnt]; French: Charles-Louis comte de Ficquelmont; 23 March 1777 – 7 April 1857) was an Austrian aristocrat, statesman and General of the cavalry of the Austrian Imperial army of French noble origin.

== Biography ==
=== French nobleman ===
He was born Gabriel-Charles-Louis-Bonnaventure, Count de Ficquelmont at the Castle of Dieuze, in his family's estate in the present-day French département of Moselle. A member of a noble family from Lorraine dating back to the 14th century (House of Ficquelmont), he was introduced to King Louis XVI at Versailles in 1789.

Only a few months later, the French Revolution started. His family, as aristocrats, were targeted by the Revolution; several of his relatives were beheaded and many of their estates were confiscated during the Terreur era. Ficquelmont chose to join the "Army of the Princes" fighting against revolutionary France.

=== Austrian military ===
He eventually entered the military service of the Habsburg monarchy in 1793. Ficquelmont participated in all Austrian campaigns in the Revolutionary and Napoleonic Wars and was regarded as a brilliant military officer. In 1809, he rose to the rank of Oberst and was appointed chief of staff of Archduke Ferdinand Karl Joseph of Austria-Este. In 1811 and 1812, he led troops in Spain, where his victories attracted the attention of Emperor Napoleon I, who unsuccessfully tried to recruit him. He was then elevated to the rank of Generalmajor in 1814 and received the capitulation of Lyon a few months later.

In the following decades, Ficquelmont continued his rise in the imperial Austrian military, achieving the following promotions:

- 1830: Feldmarschallleutnant
- 1831: General of the Dragoons
- 1840-1848: Minister of the State and conferences, in charge of the Imperial Army
- 1843: General of the cavalry

=== Austrian diplomat ===
In 1815, thanks to his credentials as a gifted military officer loyal to the Habsburgs, Ficquelmont was approached to represent Austria as a diplomat.

As the War of the Sixth Coalition ended, he was sent to Stockholm as the Austrian Ambassador Extraordinary to Sweden. His mission was to smooth relations between Austria and the newly elected heir to the Swedish throne and former French General Bernadotte in order to maintain him within the coalition during the progressing towards the Congress of Vienna. The mission was a success, launching Ficquelmont's diplomatic career.

After the fall of Napoleon, Italy was once again the key sphere of influence of the Austrian Empire, which intended to exert control over its many states. In 1820, Ficquelmont was appointed Ambassador to Tuscany and Lucca, in order to increase Austrian influence over Grand Duke Ferdinand III of Tuscany. He met his future wife, Russian countess Dorothea von Tiesenhaussen, while in Florence.

In 1821 he was appointed ambassador plenipotentiary to the Naples in the midst of the political crisis that followed the 1820 Carbonari Revolution. In July 1820 a military revolt broke out in Naples, forcing their king into signing a constitution based on the model of the Spanish Constitution of 1812. The Holy Alliance feared the revolt might spread to other Italian states and turn into a general European conflagration, so Austria sent an army to march into Naples to restore order. The Austrians defeated the Neapolitans at Rieti (7 March 1821) and entered Naples. Ficquelmont was sent to manage the following occupation. He soon gained enormous influence over king Ferdinand I and Neapolitan elites and practically administrated the kingdom, ensuring Austria's grasp over its domestic and foreign policies. While in Naples, Ficquelmont was recognized as Austria's main diplomatic asset for his political subtlety as well as his social skills, "Count de Ficquelmont's personality is made of Germanic seriousness, Italian subtlety but, above all, it is made of the prodigious 18th century French nobility's wit"

In 1829, Ficquelmont was appointed Ambassador Extraordinary to Russia. Ficquelmont's wife, countess Dorothea von Tiesenhausen, was the heiress of the prominent Tiesenhausen family as well as the granddaughter of Prince Kutuzov and became influential on the politics of Emperor Nicholas I. The Saltykov Mansion that was the Austrian Embassy had been described as a "place of wisdom and intelligence" and as "(...) the setting the two most illustrious salon of the period (1830s), reigned over by Ficquelmont's wife". Ficquelmont's and Dorothea's influence in Russia was long-lasting and as a sign of his appreciation, Emperor Nicolas I awarded him the Orders of St. Andrew, St. Alexander Nevsky, St. Vladimir, and St. Anna.

=== Austrian statesman ===
In 1839, Ficquelmont was recalled to Vienna to assume the duties of the Foreign Office during the absence of Prince Metternich.

In 1840, he was appointed Minister of the State and Conferences and chief of staff of the Imperial Army. Ficquelmont was not only Prince Metternich's right-hand man but officially the second most senior statesmen of the Empire, "Count de Ficquelmont stands just behind or next to Prince Metternich (..) Every conference starts with Count de Ficquelmont and ends with Prince Metternich".

Back in Vienna, the Ficquelmonts were some of the most prominent social figures of the Imperial court, "Count de Ficquelmont's salon is the most sophisticated, the most erudite, the most mindful, and the most beloved of Vienna". In 1841, Ficquelmont's daughter, countess Elizabeth Alexandrine, married Prince Edmund von Clary-und-Aldringen, heir to one of the Empire's most prominent princely family.

In 1847, Ficquelmont was sent to Milan as acting Chancellor of Lombardy–Venetia and senior advisor of its viceroy, Archduke Rainer Joseph of Austria. Resentment against Austrian rule was growing and Ficquelmont was appointed to restore it while taking over Northern Italy's administration. After just a few months, he was recalled to Vienna to assume the leadership of the Council of War as the Revolutions of 1848 started.

=== Minister-President of the Austrian Empire ===
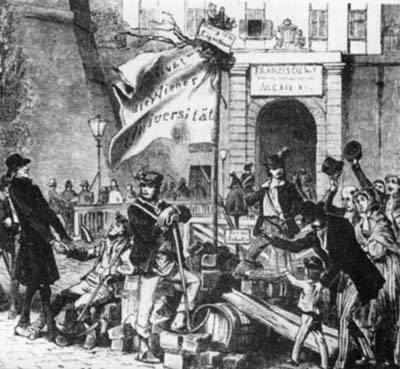
The Viennese students, 13 March 1848.

As the Revolutions of 1848 continued, Ficquelmont played an instrumental role. From early 1848 to 13 March, he led the Austrian Council of War. On 13 March Prince Metternich gave his resignation and fled the country. Ficquelmont then assumed his duties until 17 March, when Count Franz Anton von Kolowrat was appointed Minister-President. From 17 March until the fall of the Kolowrat cabinet on 3 April, Ficquelmont took charge of the Department of Foreign Affairs and the War Ministry.

On 4 April Ficquelmont became Minister-President of the Empire. However, due to his close ties with the "Metternich System" and the Russian tsar, popular feeling against him compelled him to resign on 4 May. It was a violent period, his wife Countess Dolly, who was at their Venice's palace at the time, was arrested twice by the Venetian guarda civil and finally had to flee the city on board an English ship with her daughter, son-in-law, and grandchildren. Moreover, Ficquelmont's kinsman in the War Ministry, count Theodor Franz Baillet von Latour, was lynched during the Vienna Uprising of October 1848.

=== Later life ===
After the end of the revolutions, Ficquelmont refused to return to politics to dedicated himself to the writing and publishing of several political essays that gained wide recognition throughout Europe.

- Germany, Austria and Prussia published in Vienna in 1851
- Lord Palmerston, England and the Continent published in Vienna in 1852
- The Religious Side of the Eastern Question and Politics of Russia and the Danubian Principalitie published in Vienna in 1854
- The Peace to Come: A Matter of Conscience published in Vienna in 1856
- Moral and Political thoughts of the Count de Ficquelmont, State Minister of Austria, published posthumously in Paris in 1859

In 1852, Emperor Franz Joseph I of Austria made Ficquelmont a Knight of the Golden Fleece, the most prestigious order of the Empire.

In his later years, Ficquelmont retired first to his palace of Vienna and later to his Venetian palace, where he died in 1857 at the age of 80.

== Family ==
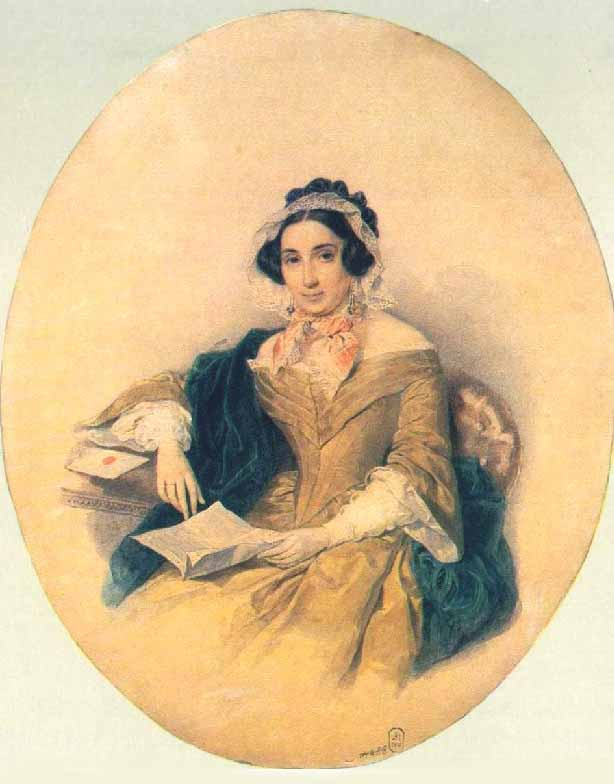
Portrait of countess Dorothea de Ficquelmont, born Countess von Tiesenhausen

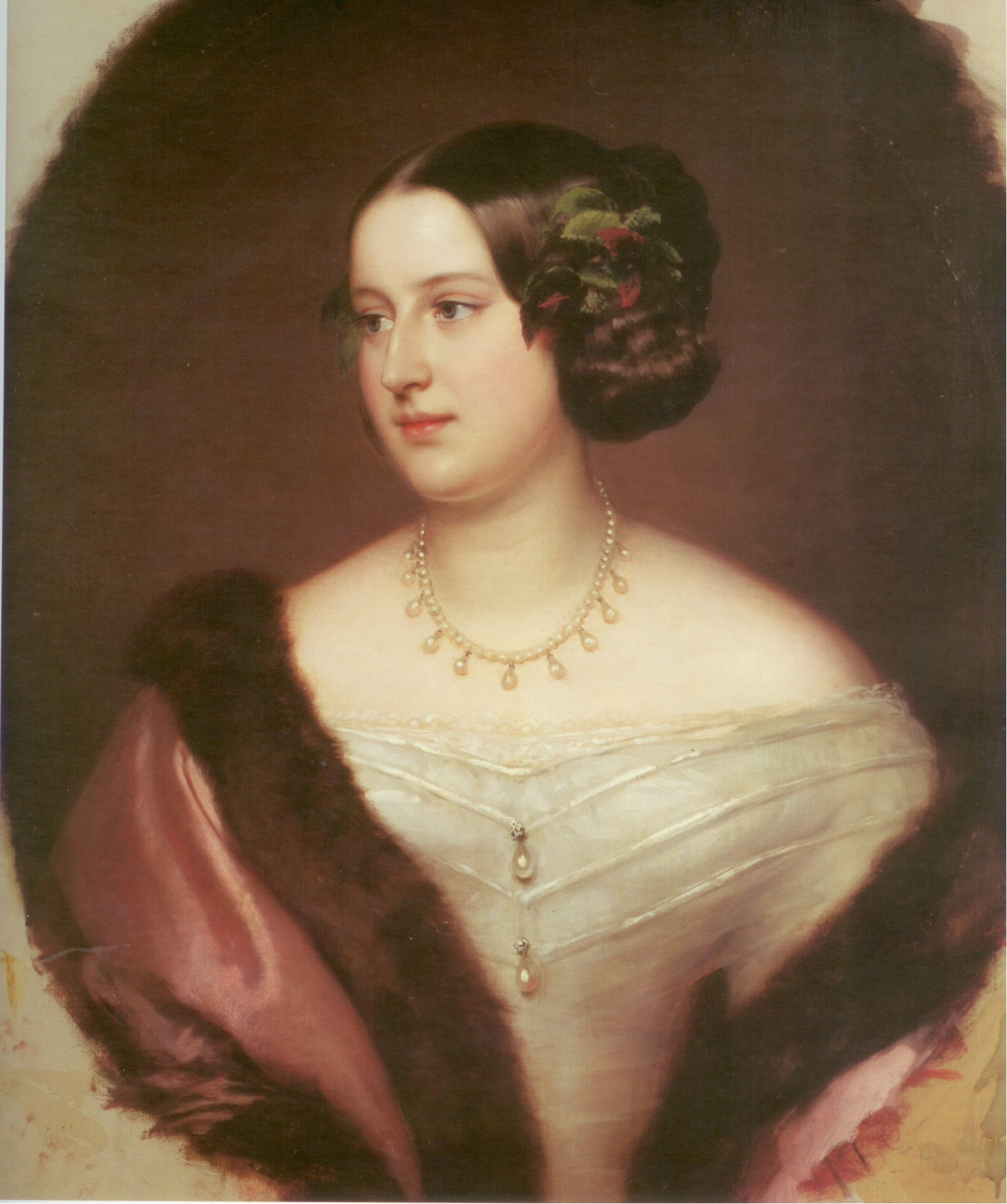
Portrait of countess Elisabeth-Alexandrine de Ficquelmont, Princess Clary-Aldringen

As a consequence of the French Revolution, the Ficquelmont family spread across Europe. Beyond Austria and France, members of the family settled in Italy, Hungary, England and the Netherlands, where one of Charles-Louis's uncle, Count Antoine-Charles de Ficquelmont (1753−1833), recreated the title Count de Ficquelmont in the Dutch nobility (16 July 1822).

Charles-Louis had five siblings of which only one had issue, one girl and one boy. His niece was Clotilde de Vaux (Paris 1815–Paris 1846), who gave philosopher Auguste Comte the inspiration for the Religion of Humanity organized around the public veneration of Humanity through a Goddess made after her. In 1821, Ficquelmont, 44, married countess Dorothea von Tiesenhausen (St. Petersburg 1804 − Venice 1863), 17, granddaughter of Prince Kutuzov. Countess Dorothea de Ficquelmont was famous for her beauty, while living in Naples a famous Neapolitan proverb was diverted to praise her looks « Vedi Napoli, la Ficquelmont e poi muori ! » (« To see Naples, the countess Ficquelmont, and die ! »). Countess Dolly was also famous for her letter-writing and diary (the former was published in Italian and Russian in 1950) telling of her life as a high society's aristocrat in 19th-century Europe.

The couple had only one daughter, Elisabeth-Alexandrine-Marie-Thérèse de Ficquelmont (Naples 1825 − Venice 1878), Countess de Ficquelmont by birth and Princess Clary und Aldringen by her marriage to Edmund, 4th Prince of Clary-Aldringen. Through Elisabeth, he was a grandfather of Prince Siegfried von Clary-Aldringen (Teplitz 1848 − Teplitz 1929) and Count Manfred von Clary-Aldringen (Vienna 1852 − Salzburg 1928).

== Decorations ==
- Knight of the Order of the Golden Fleece
- Grand Cross of the Order of Saint Januarius

== Works ==
- Aufklärungen über die Zeit vom 20 März bis zum 4 Mai, 1848 (second edition, 1850)
- Die religiöse Seite der orientalischen Frage (second edition, 1854)
- Deutschland, Österreich und Preußen (1851)
- Lord Palmerston, England und der Kontinent (2 volumes, 1852)
- Die religiöse Seite der orientalischen Frage (1854)
- Russlands Politik und die Donaufürstentümer (1854)
- Zum künftigen Frieden: e. Gewissensfrage (1856)
- Pensées et réflexions morales et politiques du Comte de Ficquelmont, ministre d'état en Autriche (1859)

Preceded by Count Franz Anton von Kolowrat-Liebsteinsky	Minister-President of the Austrian Empire; 1848	Succeeded by Baron Franz von Pillersdorf
