= Dieuze =

- Commune
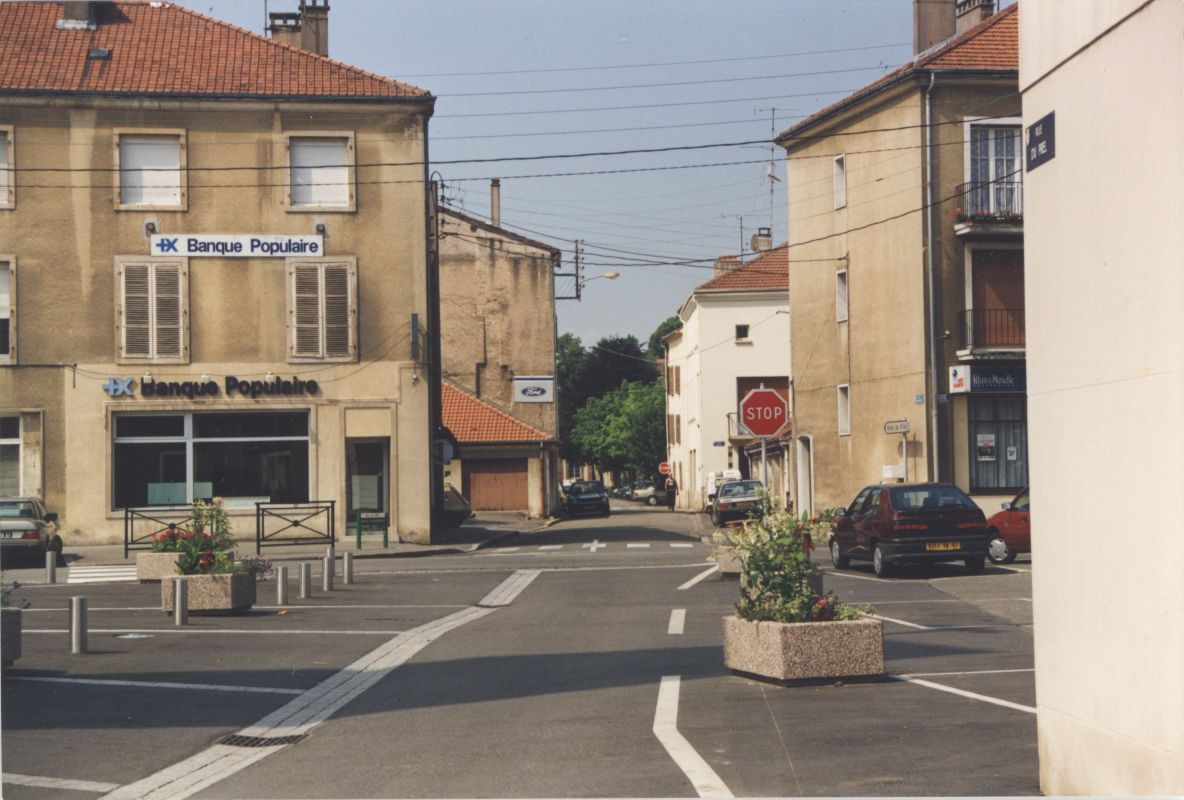
- A view within Dieuze

- Coat of arms
- Location of Dieuze
- Location within France Location within Grand Est
- Coordinates: 48°48′46″N 6°43′14″E
- Country: France
- Region: Grand Est
- Department: Moselle
- Arrondissement: Sarrebourg-Château-Salins
- Canton: Le Saulnois
- Intercommunality: CC Saulnois

Government
  - Mayor (2020–2026): Jérôme Lang
- Area^{1}: 9.35 km^{2} (3.61 sq mi)
- Highest elevation: 245 m (804 ft)
- Lowest elevation: 205 m (673 ft)
- Population (2023): 2,770
  - Density: 296/km^{2} (767/sq mi)
- Time zone: UTC+01:00 (CET)
  - Summer (DST): UTC+02:00 (CEST)
- INSEE/Postal code: 57177 /57260
- ^{1} French Land Register data, which excludes lakes, ponds, glaciers > 1 km^{2} (0.386 sq mi or 247 acres) and river estuaries.

Dieuze (French pronunciation: [djøz]; German: Duß) is a commune in the Moselle department, Grand Est region, France.

== Population ==
Historical population
Year	Pop.	±% p.a.
1968	4,075	—
1975	4,141	+0.23%
1982	3,893	−0.88%
1990	3,566	−1.09%
1999	3,612	+0.14%
2007	3,798	+0.63%
2012	3,491	−1.67%
2017	2,903	−3.62%
2023	2,770	−0.78%
Source: INSEE

== People ==
Dieuze was the birthplace of:

- Charles Hermite, mathematician
- Edmond François Valentin About, novelist, publicist and journalist
- Émile Friant, painter
- Gustave Charpentier, composer
- Count Karl Ludwig von Ficquelmont, Austrian statesman and general

== See also ==
- Communes of the Moselle department
