= Palazzo Clary =

Coordinates: 45°25′49″N 12°19′28″E

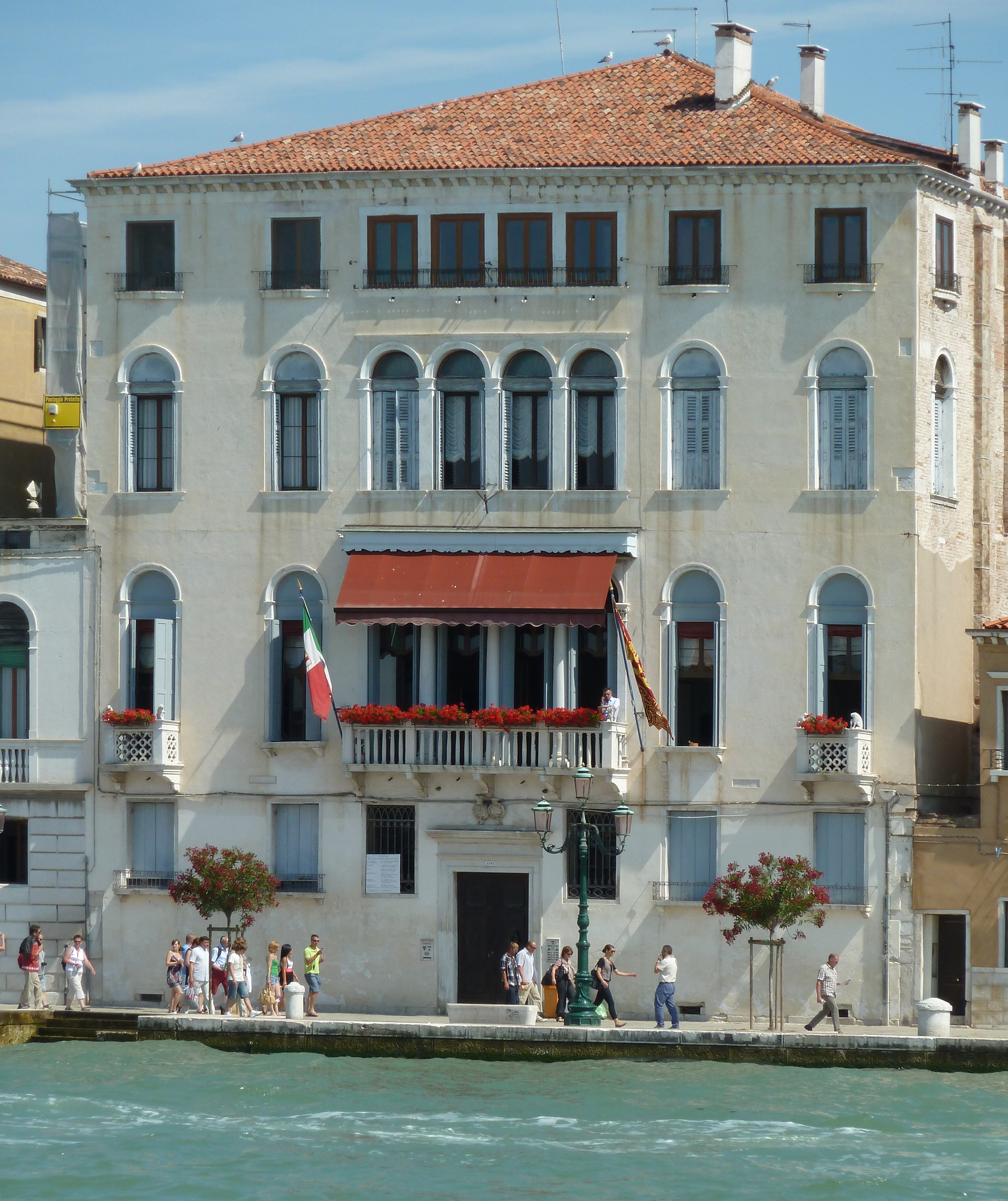
Palazzo Clary, Venice

The Palazzo Clary (Clary Palace) is a Late Renaissance Venetian palace facing the Giudecca Canal alongside the fondamenta Zattere by the ponte longo in Venice's Dorsoduro. It was originally built in the 17th century for a Venetian noble family. In the early 19th century, the palazzo was known as Palazzo Clary, named after the prince Clary-Aldringen who bought it. It is next to Palazzo Giustinian Recanati.

== Description ==
Originally built in the late 17th century, during the vogue of the late Venetian Renaissance architecture, the palazzo was remodelled in the same style in the 19th century. The late Renaissance façade onto the Zattere is a notable landmark of Dorsoduro.

The palazzo's architecture is typical of the Venetian Renaissance. It follows the Renaissance pattern of design on four floors: a ground floor giving access to the palace is surmounted by two piano nobiles and a third floor above them:

- the primo piano nobile, typical of Venetian Renaissance style, is made of decorated columns and eight monofora windows of which four form an open loggia; this floor contains the ceremonial rooms;
- the secondo piano nobile (secondary floor) has four monofora windows surrounding a large quadrifora glazed loggia, and houses more intimate reception spaces;
- the third floor is much simpler, with eight unadorned square windows.

The U-shaped back façade consists of two parallel wings surrounding a garden backing onto the canal. The ornamental crenellated garden wall has arched gates to the Chiesa di Ognissanti.

== History ==
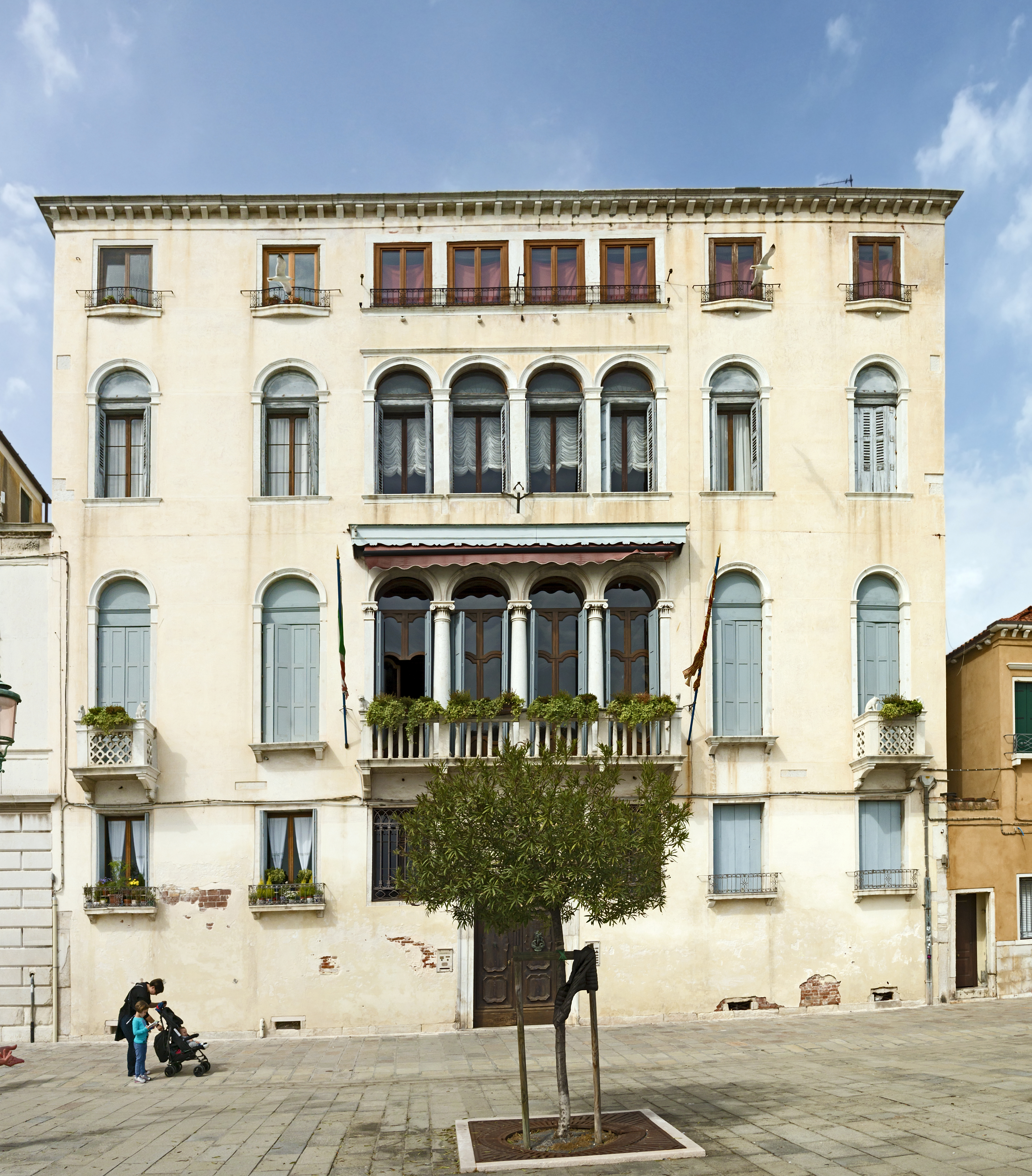
Palazzo Clary's facade on the fondamenta Zattere.

Originally built in the 17th century for a Venetian noble family, the palace, known as Palazzo Priuli-Bon, passed through different ownership, and was bought around 1855 by the Bohemian prince Edmund von Clary und Aldringen as a residence for his father-in-law Count Karl Ludwig von Ficquelmont, a central figure of Austrian diplomacy and politics.

After World War II, while still the property of the princes Clary-und-Aldringen, part of the palace was rented to France to serve as the country's consulate general in Venice until it was moved to Trieste in the late 1990s. Today, Hieronymus, 9th Prince of Clary und Aldringen (b. 1944), and his family still occupy parts of the palace.

== Bibliography ==
- Guida d'Italia – Venezia, Touring Club Italiano, 1987, p. 451.
