= Edmund, 4th Prince of Clary-Aldringen =

Serene Highness Edmund
- 4th Prince of Clary-Aldringen
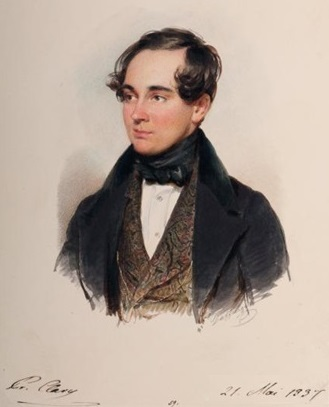
- Portrait of Prince Edmund, by Moritz Michael Daffinger, 1837
- Full name: Edmund Moritz Blasius Peregrinus von Clary und Aldringen
- Born: 3 February 1813; Vienna
- Died: 21 June 1894 (aged 81); Teplitz
- Noble family: Clary und Aldringen
- Spouse: Countess Elisabeth-Alexandrine de Ficquelmont (m. 1841; died 1878)
- Issue: Countess Edmée von Clary-Aldringen; Carlos, 5th Prince of Clary-Aldringen; Siegfried, 6th Prince of Clary-Aldringen; Count Manfred von Clary-Aldringen
- Father: Carl Joseph, 3rd Prince of Clary-Aldringen
- Mother: Countess Marie Aloisie Chotek von Chotkow und Wognin

Edmund Moritz Blasius Peregrinus von Clary und Aldringen (3 February 1813 – 21 June 1894) was an Austro-Hungarian prince.

== Early life ==
Edmund was born on 3 February 1813 in Vienna, Austria. He was the second, but eldest surviving, son of Carl Joseph, 3rd Prince of Clary-Aldringen, and Countess Marie "Aloisie" Chotek von Chotkow und Wognin (1777–1864), who were first cousins. His elder sister, Countess Mathilde Christina married Prince Wilhelm Radziwiłł, 14th Duke of Nieśwież. (Note: His brother-in-law, Prince Wilhelm Radziwiłł, 14th Duke of Nieśwież, was the eldest son of Prince Antoni Henryk Radziwiłł, and Princess Louise of Prussia (a niece of the Prussian King Frederick the Great).) Among his other siblings were Countess Leontine, who married Prince Bogusław Fryderyk Radziwiłł, (Note: His brother-in-law, Prince Bogusław Fryderyk Radziwiłł, was the younger brother of Countess Mathilde Christina's husband, Prince Wilhelm Radziwiłł.) and Countess Felicitas, who married Count Robert of Salm-Reifferscheidt-Raitz. (Note: His brother-in-law, Count Robert of Salm-Reifferscheidt-Raitz, was a son of Franz Joseph, Hereditary Prince of Salm-Reifferscheidt-Raitz (as eldest son and heir apparent of Karl Joseph, 1st Prince of Salm-Reifferscheidt-Raitz) and Maria Josepha McCaffry von Keanmore. Count Robert's elder brother was Hugo, 2nd Prince of Salm-Reifferscheidt-Raitz.)

His paternal grandparents were Johann Nepomuk, 2nd Prince of Clary-Aldringen, and Princess Marie Christine Leopoldine de Ligne. (Note: His paternal grandmother, Princess Marie Christine Leopoldine de Ligne, was the daughter of Charles-Joseph, 7th Prince of Ligne and Princess Franziska von Liechtenstein (a daughter of Prince Emanuel of Liechtenstein and elder sister of the reigning Prince, Franz Joseph I, Prince of Liechtenstein.) Through his sister Mathilde Christina, he was an uncle of the Prussian general Prince Antoni Wilhelm Radziwiłł. Through his sister Leontine, he was uncle to Prince Ferdynand Radziwiłł. His maternal grandparents were Johann Rudolf Chotek von Chotkov und Vojnín and Countess Maria Sidonia von Clary und Aldringen (second daughter of the 1st Prince of Clary and Aldringen).

== Career ==
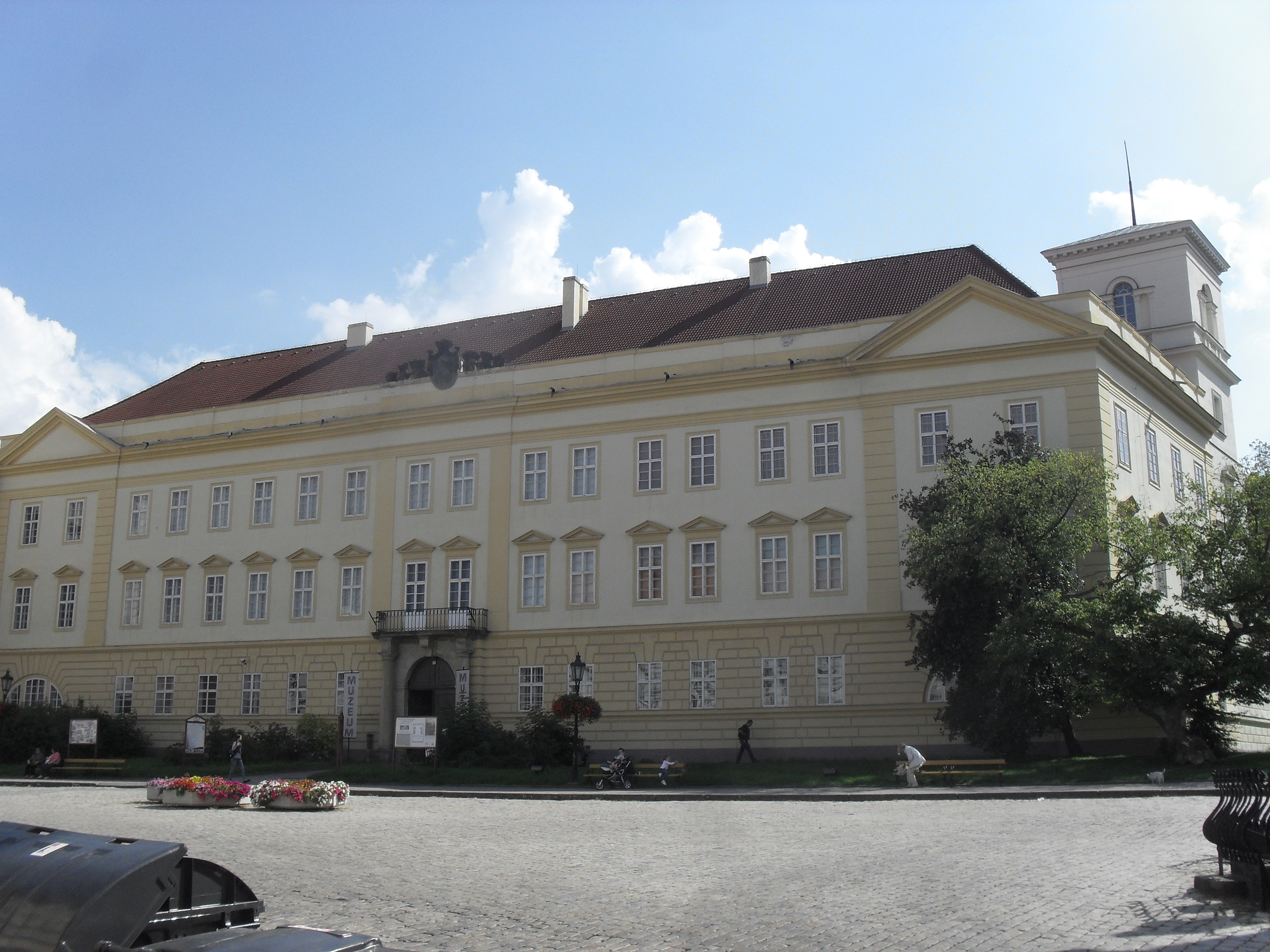
Teplitz Palace, the main residence of the family from 1634 to 1945.

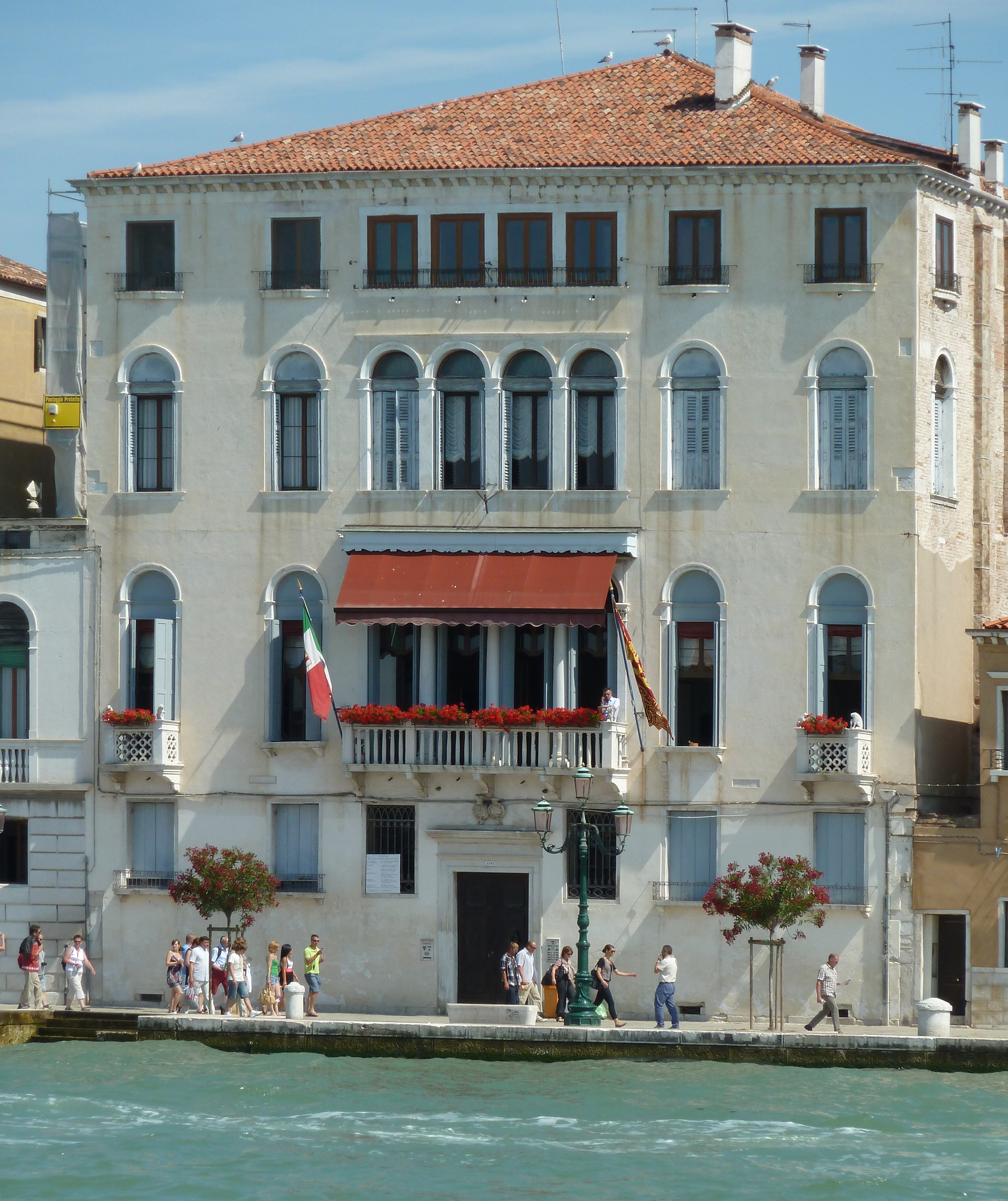
Palazzo Clary, Venice

Upon the death of his father in Vienna in 1831, the still young Edmund succeeded as the 4th Prince of Clary-Aldringen. The title had been created in 1767, for his great-grandfather, then Reichsgraf Wenzel von Clary und Aldringen, the Imperial Treasurer (and Emperor Joseph II's private council member), who was raised to princely rank. Members of the family became hereditary members of the Austrian Reichsrat (Imperial Council). From that date, the princely title of Fürst (Prince) von Clary und Aldringen was borne by the head of the family, who was styled as Durchlaucht (Serene Highness). Junior members bore the title of Graf (Count) or Gräfin (Countess) von Clary und Aldringen and were styled as Erlaucht (Illustrious Highness).

During the 19th century, Edmund hosted royalty several times at his family's Teplitz Palace: (Note: During the Napoleonic Wars, Teplitz Palace was the headquarters of the Sixth Coalition against Napoleon, uniting the monarchs of Austria, Prussia and Russia. There was first signed the triple alliance against Napoleon that led to the coalition victory at the nearby Battle of Kulm and eventually instated the Holy Alliance, officially signed in Paris on 26 September 1815.) in 1835, they received King Frederick William III of Prussia, Emperor Nicholas I of Russia and Emperor Franz I of Austria, hosting a ceremony in memory of the treaty of the Sixth Coalition; in 1849, they received Emperor Franz Joseph I of Austria and Kings Frederick William IV of Prussia and Frederick Augustus II of Saxony; in 1860, they received Emperor Franz Joseph of Austria and the Prince-Regent Wilhelm of Prussia.

=== Palazzo Clary ===
In 1855, Edmund bought the Palazzo Priuli-Bon (today known as Palazzo Clary) in Venice, a 17th-century palace built for a Venetian noble family. He bought it as a residence for his father-in-law, Count Karl Ludwig von Ficquelmont, a central figure of Austrian diplomacy and politics. It remains in the hands of the Clary und Aldringen family to this day.

== Personal life ==
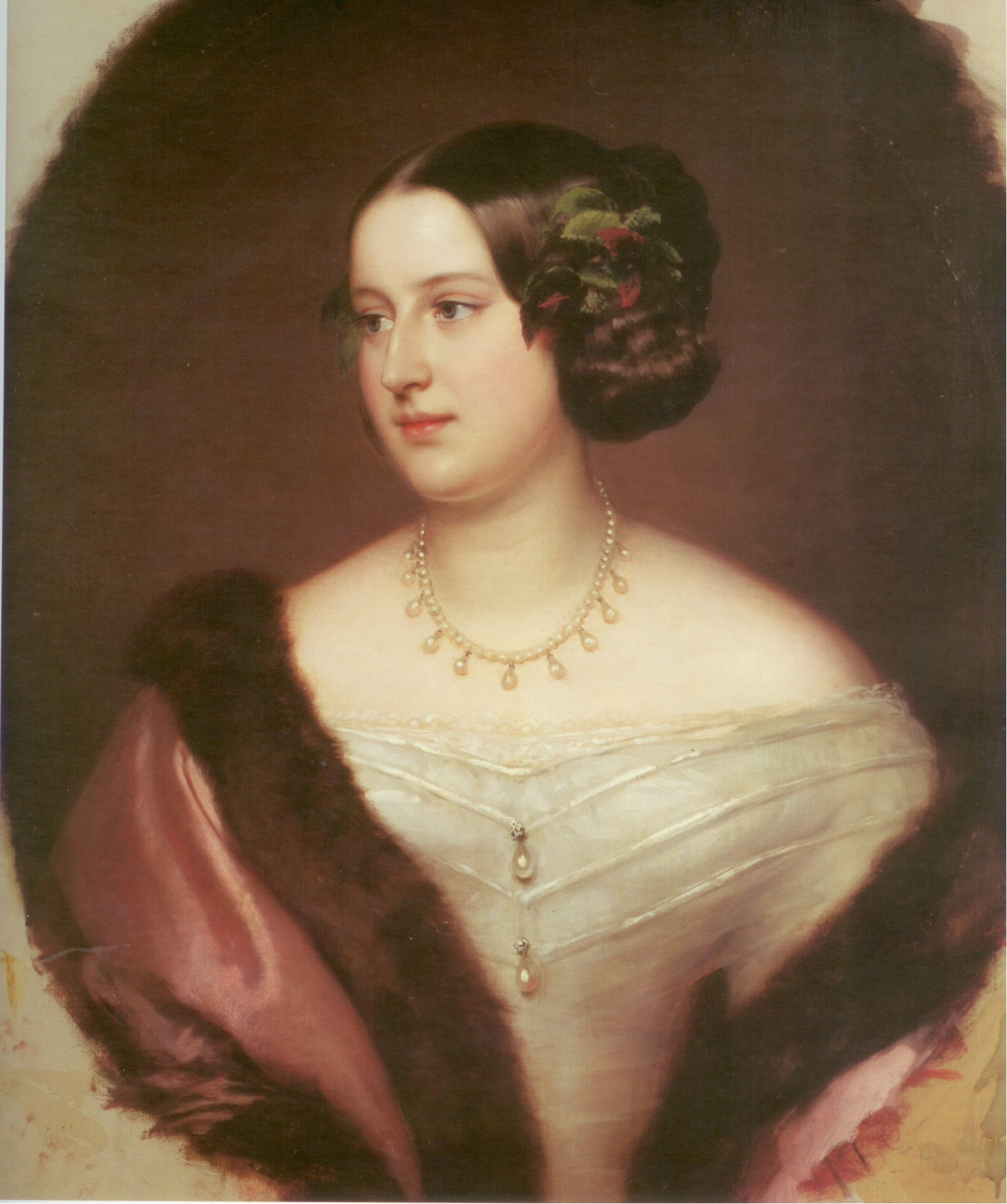
Portrait of his wife, Countess Elisabeth-Alexandrine de Ficquelmont, by Franz Schrotzberg, 1847

In 1841, Edmund married Countess Elisabeth-Alexandrine de Ficquelmont (1825–1878), a daughter of Count Karl Ludwig von Ficquelmont and Countess Dorothea de Ficquelmont (a daughter of Count Ferdinand von Tiesenhausen). Together, they were the parents of at least one daughter and three sons, including:

- Countess Edmée Caroline Luise Dorothee Therese Marie von Clary und Aldringen (1842–1927), who married Carlo Felice Nicolis, Count of Robilant and Cereaglio, a son of Maurizio Nicolis, Count of Robilant and Cereaglio and Maria Antonia von Waldburg Cappustigall Nicolis.
- Maria Carlos Borromäus Joseph Richard Franz Sales Johann Nepomuk von Clary und Aldringen (1844–1920), who married his cousin, Princess Felicia Radziwiłł, a daughter of Prince Bogusław Fryderyk Radziwiłł and Countess Leontine von Clary und Aldringen.
- Siegfried Franz Johann Carl von Clary und Aldringen (1848−1929), an Austro-Hungarian diplomat; he married Countess Therese Kinsky von Wchinitz und Tettau, the daughter of Count Friedrich Karl Kinsky von Wchinitz und Tettau and Countess Sophie von Mensdorff-Pouilly, in 1885.
- Manfred Alexander Robert Johann Adalbert von Clary und Aldringen (1852−1928), who briefly served as Minister-President of Austria; he married Countess Franziska Pejácsevich von Veröcze in 1884.

Edmund died at Teplitz Palace on 21 June 1894. He was succeeded by his eldest son, Carlos. Upon Carlos' death in 1920, his only son, Johannes, renounced his rights in favor of his uncle, Siegfried, who became the 6th Prince of Clary-Aldringen.

=== Descendants ===
Through his daughter Edmée, he was a grandfather of Luigi Nicolis dei Conti di Robilant e Cereaglio, who married Morosina Morosini, only child and heiress of Gino Morosini and Annina Morosini (née Rombo), an Annina served as a lady-in-waiting to Elena, Queen of Italy.

Through his son Siegfried, he was a grandfather of Countess Elisalex von Clary und Aldringen (1885–1955), who married Count Henri de Baillet-Latour; (Note: Count Henri de Baillet-Latour was the son of Count Ferdinand de Baillet-Latour, former governor of the Province of Antwerp, and Countess Caroline d'Oultremont de Duras.) and Alfons, 7th Prince of Clary-Aldringen (1887–1978), who married Countess Lidwina von und zu Eltz genannt Faust von Stromberg. (Note: Countess Lidwina von und zu Eltz genannt Faust von Stromberg was a daughter of Count Johann Jacob von und zu Eltz genannt Faust von Stromberg and Princess Marie Theresia of Lobkowicz.)
