= General Radziwiłł =

General Radziwiłł may refer to:

- Antoni Wilhelm Radziwiłł (1833–1904), Prussian Army General of the Artillery
- Antoni Radziwiłł (1775–1833), Prussian Army lieutenant general
- Bogusław Fryderyk Radziwiłł (1809–1873), Prussian Army general
- Bogusław Radziwiłł (1620–1669), Polish–Lithuanian Commonwealth general
- Karol Stanisław Radziwiłł (1734–1790), Polish–Lithuanian Commonwealth general
- Michał Gedeon Radziwiłł (1778–1850), general of Polish forces in the November Uprising
