= Carl Joseph, 3rd Prince of Clary-Aldringen =

Serene Highness Carl Joseph
- 3rd Prince of Clary-Aldringen
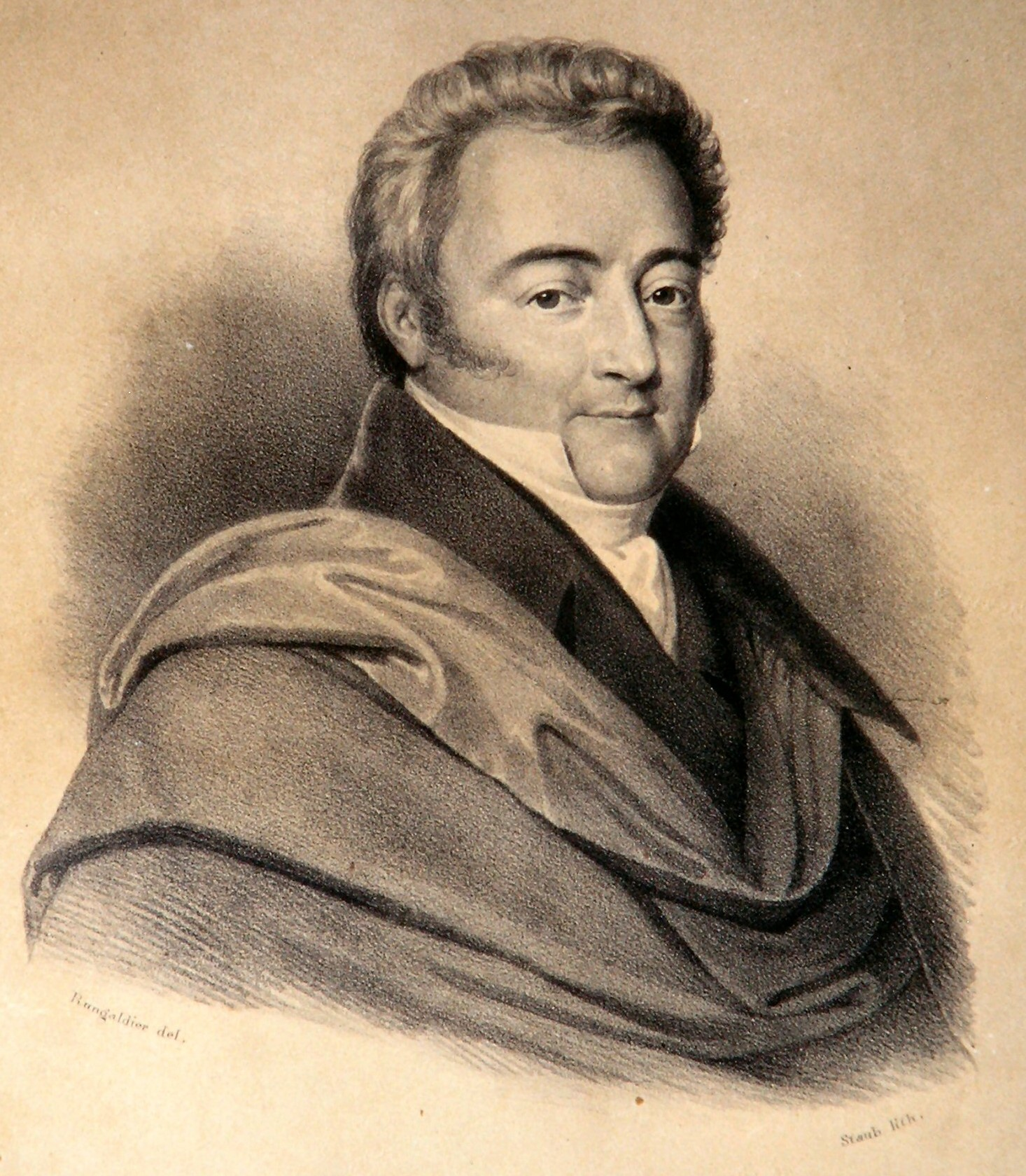
- Full name: Karel Josef von Clary und Aldringen
- Born: 12 December 1777; Vienna
- Died: 31 May 1831 (aged 53); Vienna
- Noble family: Clary und Aldringen
- Spouse: Countess Marie Aloisie Chotek von Chotkow und Wognin (m. 1802; died 1831)
- Issue: Countess Mathilde Christina; Count Alfred; Countess Euphemie; Countess Leontine; Edmund, 4th Prince of Clary-Aldringen; Countess Felicitas
- Father: Johann Nepomuk, 2nd Prince of Clary-Aldringen
- Mother: Princess Marie Christine Leopoldine de Ligne

Karel Josef von Clary und Aldringen (12 December 1777 – 31 May 1831) was an Austro-Hungarian prince.

== Early life ==
Karel Josef was born on 12 December 1777 in Vienna, Austria. He was the son of Johann Nepomuk, 2nd Prince of Clary-Aldringen (1753–1826), and Princess Marie Christine Leopoldine de Ligne (1757–1830). His younger brother was Count Franz Moritz Joseph Mathaeus von Clary und Aldringen, who never married.

His paternal grandparents were Franz Wenzel, 1st Prince of Clary-Aldringen, and Maria Franziska Josepha von Hohenzollern-Hechingen (a daughter of Count Herman Frederik von Hohenzollern-Hechingen (Note: Prince Carl Joseph's great-grandfather, Imperial Field Marshal Count Herman Frederik von Hohenzollern-Hechingen (1665–1733), was the second son of Philipp, 3rd Prince of Hohenzollern-Hechingen and younger brother to Friedrich Wilhelm, 4th Prince of Hohenzollern-Hechingen. Count Herman Frederik's first wife was Princess Eleonore Magdalene of Brandenburg-Bayreuth (1673–1711), daughter of Christian Ernst, Margrave of Brandenburg-Bayreuth.) and, his second wife, Countess Maria Josepha of Oettingen-Spielberg). His maternal grandparents were Charles-Joseph, 7th Prince of Ligne, and Princess Franziska Xaveria Maria von Liechtenstein (a daughter of Prince Emanuel of Liechtenstein). His maternal grandmother, Princess Franziska, was the elder sister of the reigning Prince, Franz Joseph I, Prince of Liechtenstein.

== Career ==
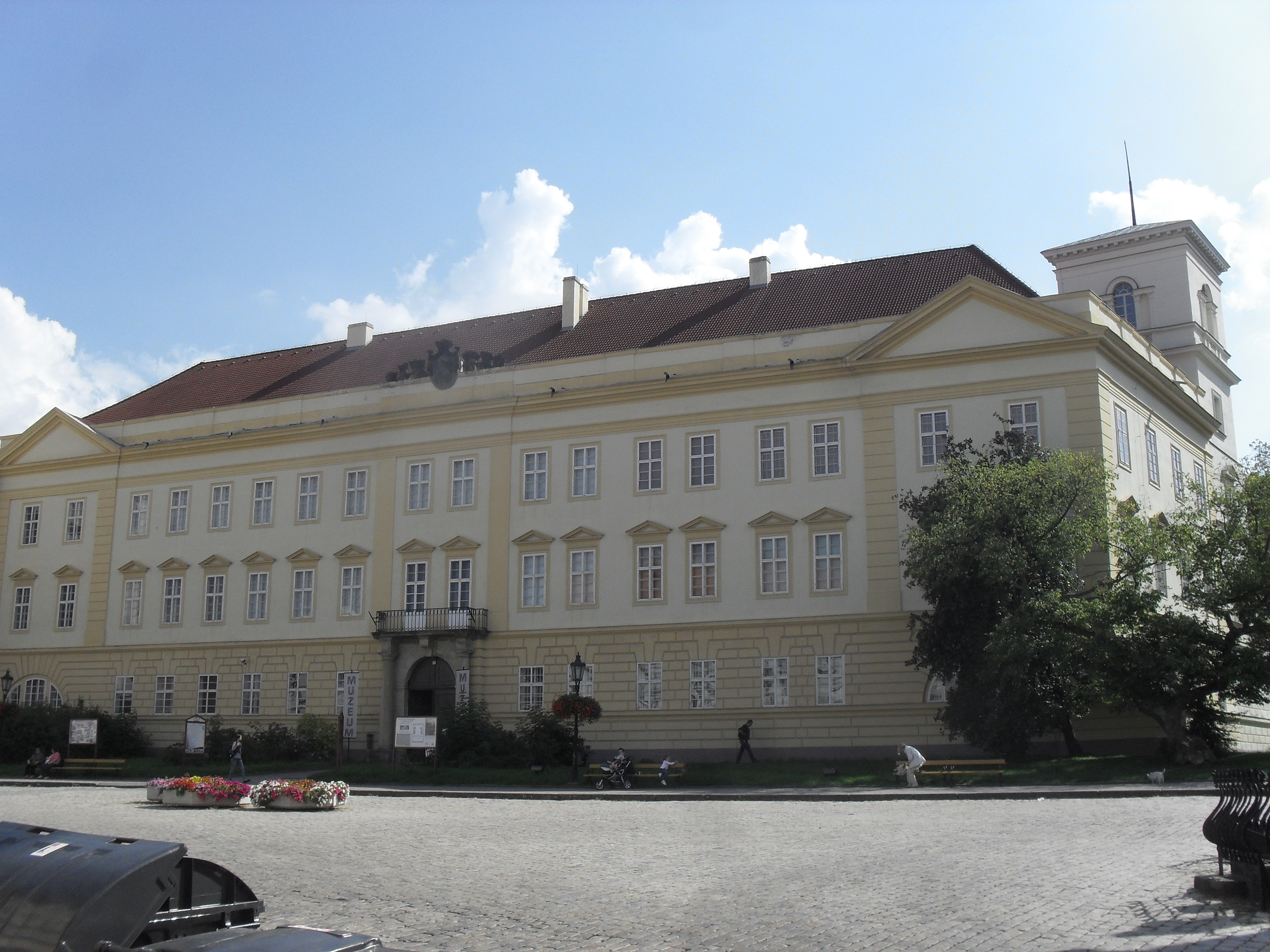
Teplitz Palace, the main residence of the family from 1634 to 1945.

During the Napoleonic Wars, the family's Teplitz Palace was the headquarters of the Sixth Coalition against Napoleon, uniting the monarchs of Austria, Prussia and Russia. There was first signed the triple alliance against Napoleon I that led to the coalition victory at the nearby Battle of Kulm and eventually instated the Holy Alliance, officially signed in Paris on 26 September 1815.

Upon the death of his father in 1826, he succeeded as the 3rd Prince of Clary-Aldringen. The title had been created in 1767, for his grandfather, then Reichsgraf Wenzel von Clary und Aldringen, the Imperial Treasurer (and Emperor Joseph II's private council member), who was raised to princely rank. Members of the family became hereditary members of the Austrian Reichsrat (Imperial Council). From that date, the princely title of Fürst (Prince) von Clary und Aldringen was borne by the head of the family, who was styled as Durchlaucht (Serene Highness). Junior members bore the title of Graf (Count) or Gräfin (Countess) von Clary und Aldringen and were styled as Erlaucht (Illustrious Highness).

== Personal life ==
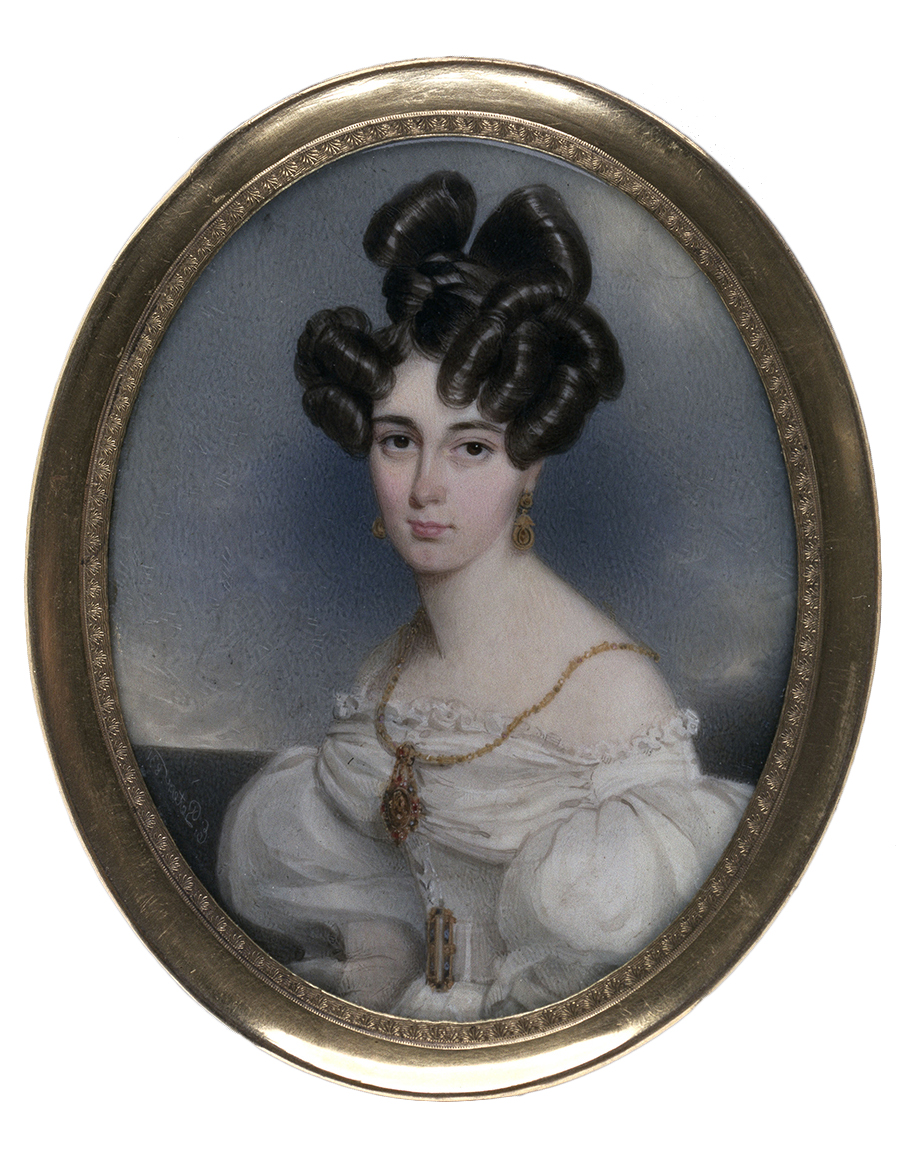
Portrait of his daughter, Countess Mathilde Christina, by Emanuel Thomas Peter, 1831

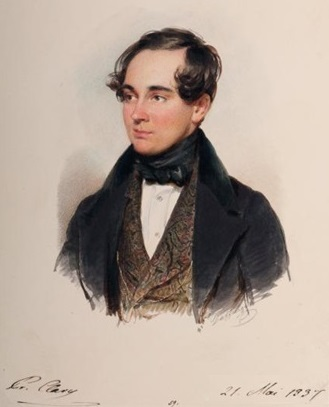
Portrait of his son, Edmund, by Moritz Michael Daffinger, 1837

On 26 October 1802 at Neuhof, Karel Josef was married to his first cousin, Countess Marie "Aloisie" Chotek von Chotkow und Wognin (1777–1864), the daughter of Johann Rudolf Chotek von Chotkov und Vojnín and Countess Maria Sidonia von Clary und Aldringen (second daughter of the 1st Prince of Clary and Aldringen). Together, they were the parents of:

- Countess Mathilde Christina Josepha Sidonia Christina Maria von Clary und Aldringen (1806–1896), who married, as his second wife, Prince Wilhelm Radziwiłł, 14th Duke of Nieśwież, the eldest son of Prince Antoni Henryk Radziwiłł, and Princess Louise of Prussia (a niece of the Prussian King Frederick the Great), in 1832.
- Count Alfred Ernst Johann Nepomuk Desiderius Franz Borgia von Clary und Aldringen (1807–1809), who died young.
- Countess Euphemie Flora Francisca Xaveria Maria Catharine von Clary und Aldringen (1808–1867), who died unmarried.
- Countess Leontine Francisca Gabriëlle Christina von Clary und Aldringen (1811–1890), who married Prince Bogusław Fryderyk Radziwiłł, a younger brother of Prince Wilhelm Radziwiłł, in 1832.
- Edmund Moritz Blasius Peregrinus von Clary und Aldringen (1813–1894), who married Countess Elisabeth-Alexandrine de Ficquelmont, a daughter of Count Karl Ludwig von Ficquelmont and Countess Dorothea de Ficquelmont (a daughter of Count Ferdinand von Tiesenhausen), in 1841.
- Countess Theodora Felicitas Maria Sidonia Josepha Dionisia von Clary und Aldringen (1815–1902), who married Count Robert of Salm-Reifferscheidt-Raitz, a son of Franz Joseph, Hereditary Prince of Salm-Reifferscheidt-Raitz (as eldest son and heir apparent of Karl Joseph, 1st Prince of Salm-Reifferscheidt-Raitz). Count Robert's elder brother was Hugo, 2nd Prince of Salm-Reifferscheidt-Raitz.

Karel Josef died on 31 May 1831, also in Vienna. As his eldest son died in childhood, he was succeeded by his second son, Edmund, who bought the Palazzo Clary in Venice in 1855.

=== Descendants ===
Through his daughter Mathilde Christina, he was a grandfather of the Prussian general Prince Antoni Wilhelm Radziwiłł (1833–1904), who married Marie de Castellane, the daughter Henri de Castellane and Pauline de Talleyrand-Périgord.

Through his son Edmund, he was posthumously a grandfather of Austro-Hungarian diplomat, Prince Siegfried von Clary-Aldringen (1848−1929), and Count Manfred von Clary-Aldringen (1852−1928), who briefly served as Minister-President of Austria.
