= Hospozín =

- Municipality
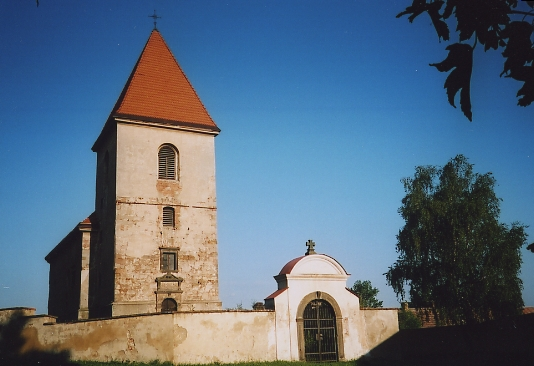
- Church of the Beheading of Saint John the Baptist

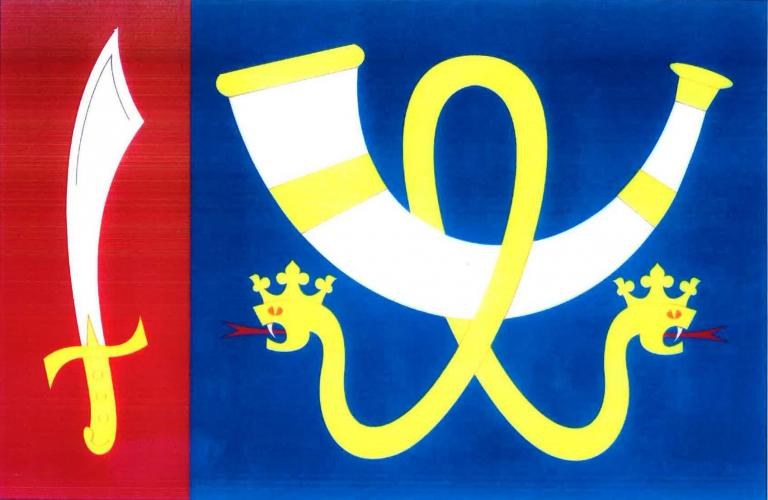
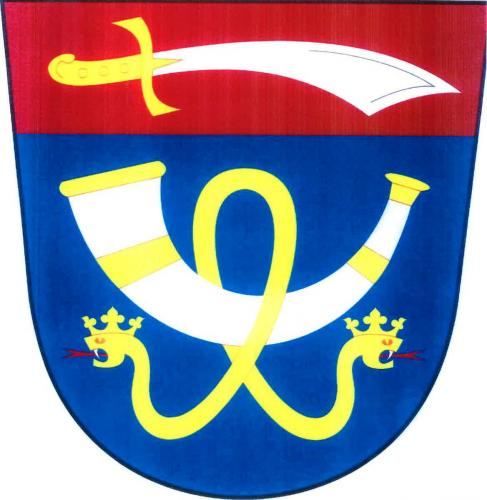
- Flag Coat of arms

- Location in the Czech Republic
- Coordinates: 50°18′25″N 14°10′19″E
- Country: Czech Republic
- Region: Central Bohemian
- District: Kladno
- First mentioned: 1318

Area
  - Total: 8.07 km^{2} (3.12 sq mi)
- Elevation: 196 m (643 ft)

Population (2026-01-01)
  - Total: 587
  - Density: 72.7/km^{2} (188/sq mi)
- Time zone: UTC+1 (CET)
  - Summer (DST): UTC+2 (CEST)
- Postal code: 273 22
- Website: www.obec-hospozin.cz

Hospozín is a municipality and village in Kladno District in the Central Bohemian Region of the Czech Republic. It has about 600 inhabitants.

== Administrative division ==
Hospozín consists of two municipal parts (in brackets population according to the 2021 census):

- Hospozín (522)
- Hospozínek (23)

== Etymology ==
The name is derived from the Old Czech word hospoz, meaning "lord's".

== Geography ==
Hospozín is located about 18 kilometres (11 mi) north of Kladno and 28 km (17 mi) northwest of Prague. It lies in a flat agricultural landscape in the Lower Ohře Table. The highest point is at 246 m (807 ft) above sea level. The stream Vranský potok flows through the municipality.

== History ==
The first written mention of Hospozín is from 1318. Until the end of the 17th century, the village was owned by various lesser noblemen. At the end of the 17th century, Hospozín was bought by the Clary-Aldringen family.

== Demographics ==
Historical population

Year	Pop.	±%
1869	512	—
1880	966	+88.7%
1890	1,096	+13.5%
1900	1,055	−3.7%
1910	981	−7.0%

Year	Pop.	±%
1921	956	−2.5%
1930	938	−1.9%
1950	664	−29.2%
1961	675	+1.7%
1970	568	−15.9%

Year	Pop.	±%
1980	512	−9.9%
1991	508	−0.8%
2001	515	+1.4%
2011	537	+4.3%
2021	545	+1.5%

Source: Censuses

== Transport ==
There are no major roads passing through the municipality. The railway that runs through Hospozín is unused.

== Sights ==
The main landmark of Hospozín is the Church of the Beheading of Saint John the Baptist. It was built in the Renaissance style in 1595 and modified in the Baroque style in 1712. It is a significant Renaissance monument.
