= Bogusław Fryderyk Radziwiłł =

Polish and Prussian nobleman

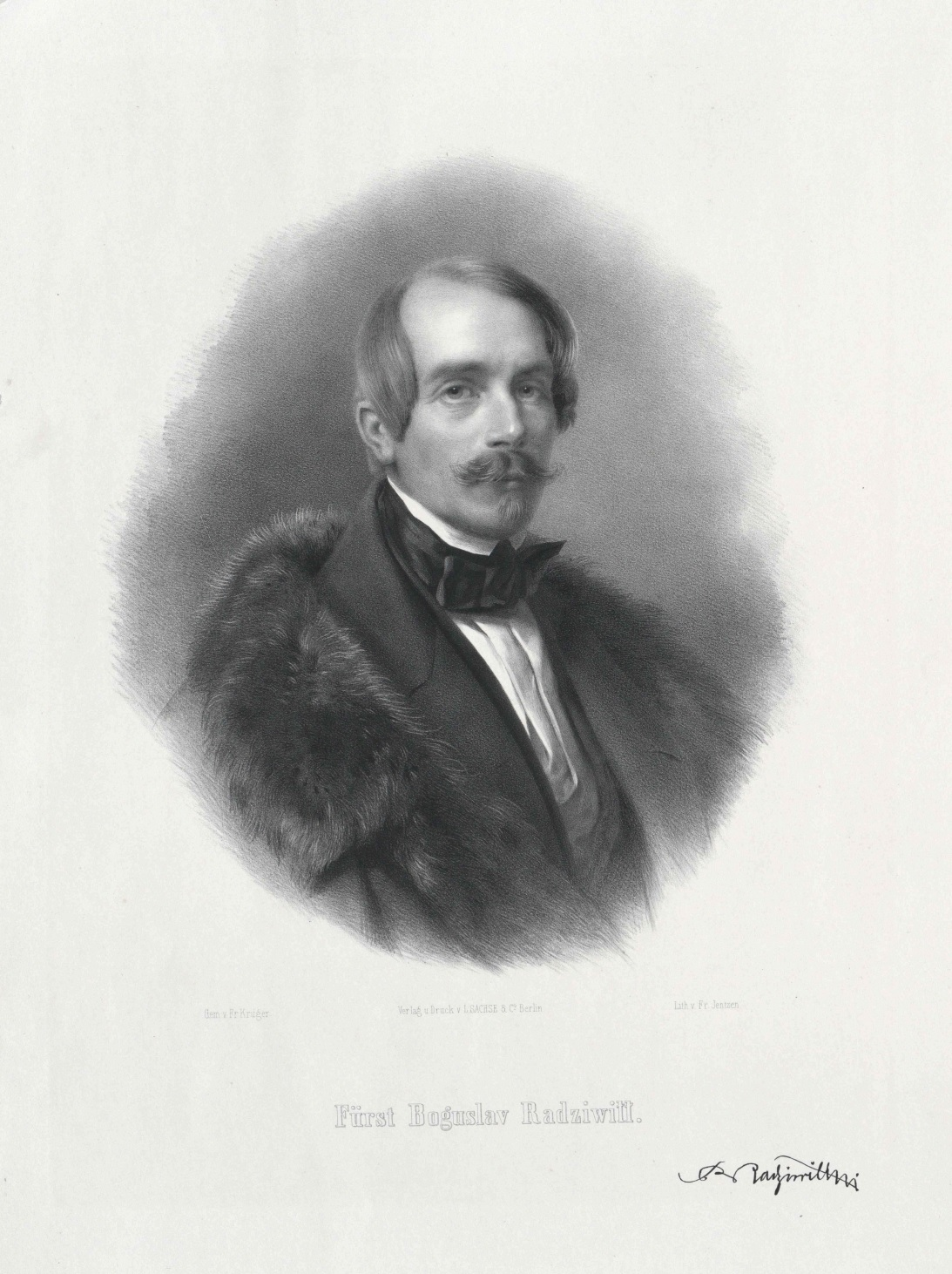
- Born: 3 January 1809; Königsberg
- Died: 2 January 1873 (aged 63); Berlin
- Spouse: Leontyna Gabriela Clary et Aldringen (m. 1832)
- Children: Elżbieta Radziwiłł; Ferdynand Fryderyk Radziwiłł; Władysław Radziwiłł; Maria Radziwiłł; Karol Radziwiłł; Jadwiga Radziwiłł; Edmund Radziwiłł; Bogusław Radziwiłł; Felicia Radziwiłł
- Parent(s): Antoni Henryk Radziwiłł; Princess Louise of Prussia

Prince Bogusław Fryderyk Radziwiłł (3 January 1809 – 2 January 1873) was a Polish nobleman and Prussian military officer and politician. He lived in the Kingdom of Prussia, where he was a member of the Prussian parliament (later, of the Prussian House of Lords). He attained the rank of general within the Prussian Army.

== Early life ==
Radziwiłł was born in Königsberg on 3 January 1809. He was a younger son of Prince Antoni Henryk Radziwiłł, the Duke-Governor (Polish: książę-namiestnik, German: Statthalter) of the Grand Duchy of Poznań, an autonomous province of the Kingdom of Prussia, and Princess Louise of Prussia (1770–1836). Among his surviving siblings were Prince Wilhelm Radziwiłł (who married Countess Mathilde von Clary und Aldringen); Prince Ferdynand Fryderyk Radziwiłł (who died unmarried); Princess Eliza Fryderyka Radziwiłł (the desired bride of Prince William of Prussia, who later became William I, German Emperor, but they were not allowed to marry); Prince Władysław Radziwiłł (who died unmarried); and Princess Wanda Augusta Wilhelmina Radziwiłł (who married their first cousin, Prince Adam Czartoryski).

His paternal grandparents were Prince Michał Hieronim Radziwiłł and Helena Przeździecka. His aunt, Princess Angelika Radziwiłł, was the wife of Prince Konstanty Adam Czartoryski. Through his brother, Prince Wilhelm, he was uncle to Prince Antoni Wilhelm Radziwiłł. His maternal grandparents were Margravine Elisabeth Louise of Brandenburg-Schwedt and Prince Augustus Ferdinand of Prussia (a younger brother of the Prussian King Frederick the Great). Through his mother, he was the great-grandson of King Frederick William I of Prussia, great-great-grandson of King George I of Great Britain, cousin of William I, German Emperor and Czar Alexander II of Russia.

== Career ==
He was a member of the Prussian parliament (later, of the Prussian House of Lords). He attained the rank of general within the Prussian Army.

== Personal life ==
In 1832, he married Countess Leontyna Gabriela Clary et Aldringen, a daughter of Carl Joseph, 3rd Prince of Clary-Aldringen and Marie "Aloisie" Chotek von Chotkow und Wognin (the daughter of Johann Rudolf Chotek von Chotkov und Vojnín). Together, they were the parents of:

- Prince Ferdynand Fryderyk Radziwiłł (1834–1926), who married Pelagia Sapieha, a daughter of Leon Ludwig Sapieha.
- Prince Władysław Radziwiłł (1836–1922)
- Princess Fryderyka Radziwiłł (1837–1843), who died young.
- Prince Fryderyk Wilhelm Janush Edmund Karol Radziwiłł (1839–1907), who married Princess Teresa Lubomirska, a daughter of Prince Yuri Lubomirski and Countess Cecilia Zamoyska.
- Princess Pauline Radziwiłł (1841–1894)
- Prince Edmund Radziwiłł (1842–1905)
- Prince Adam Radziwiłł (1844–1907)
- Princess Felicia Radziwiłł (1849–1930), who married Carlos, 5th Prince of Clary-Aldringen, elder brother of Prince Siegfried von Clary-Aldringen and Count Manfred von Clary-Aldringen.
- Princess Mathilde Radziwiłł (1850–1931)

Radziwiłł died in Berlin on 2 January 1873.

== Ancestry ==
Ancestors of Bogusław Fryderyk Radziwiłł

16. Prince Jan Mikołaj Radziwiłł
8. Prince Marcin Mikołaj Radziwłł
17. Dorota Henryka Przebendowska
4. Prince Michał Hieronim Radziwiłł
18. Jan Trębicki
9. Marta Trębicka
19. Teresa Telszewska
2. Prince Antoni Radziwiłł
20. Aleksander Przeździecki
10. Antoni Tadeusz Przeździecki
21. Constancia-Alexandra Kaminska
5. Helena Przeździecka
22. Prince Józef Ogiński
11. Katarzyna Ogińska
23. Princess Anna Wiśniowiecka
1. Bogusław Fryderyk Radziwiłł
24. Frederick I of Prussia
12. Frederick William I of Prussia
25. Sophia Charlotte of Hanover
6. Prince Augustus Ferdinand of Prussia
26. George I of Great Britain
13. Princess Sophia Dorothea of Hanover
27. Duchess Sophia Dorothea of Celle
3. Princess Louise of Prussia
28. Philip William, Margrave of Brandenburg-Schwedt
14. Frederick William, Margrave of Brandenburg-Schwedt
29. Princess Johanna Charlotte of Anhalt-Dessau
7. Margravine Elisabeth Louise of Brandenburg-Schwedt
30. Frederick William I of Prussia (= 12)
15. Princess Sophia Dorothea of Prussia
31. Princess Sophia Dorothea of Hanover (= 13)
