= Prince Siegfried von Clary-Aldringen =

Austro-Hungarian diplomat

Siegfried Fürst von Clary und Aldringen
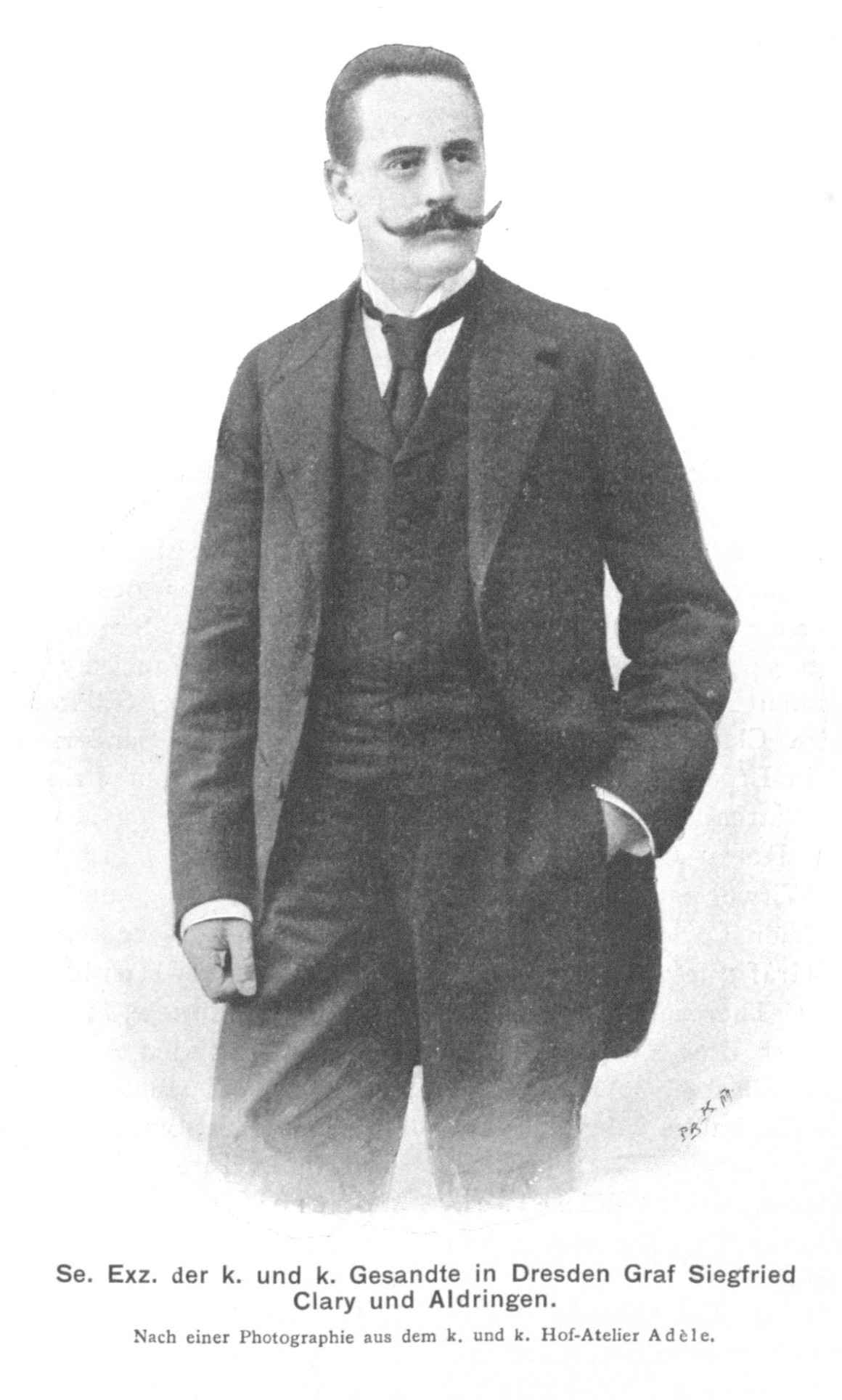

Austro-Hungarian Minister to Belgium
- In office 6 December 1902 – 28 August 1914
- Preceded by: Josef Graf Wodzicki von Granow
- Succeeded by: Interruption of diplomatic relations

Austro-Hungarian Minister to Saxony
- In office 13 November 1899 – 6 December 1902
- Preceded by: Heinrich Graf von Lützow zu Drey-Lützow und Seedorf
- Succeeded by: Ludwig Velics von Lászlófalva

Austro-Hungarian Minister to Württemberg
- In office 6 June 1897 – 13 November 1899
- Preceded by: Stephan Burián von Rajecz
- Succeeded by: Alfons Freiherr von Pereira-Arnstein

Personal details
- Born: 14 October 1848 Teplitz, Austria-Hungary (now Czech Republic)
- Died: 11 February 1929 (aged 80) Teplice, Czechoslovakia (now Czech Republic)
- Spouse(s): Therese, née Gräfin Kinsky von Wchinitz und Tettau

Siegfried Franz Johann Carl, 6th Prince of Clary und Aldringen (Count of Clary und Aldringen until 1920; 14 October 1848 – 11 February 1929), was an Austro-Hungarian diplomat during the time before World War I.

== Early life ==
He was born in Teplitz (now Teplice) on 14 October 1848 into a prominent Bohemian noble family. He was the second son of Prince Edmund Moritz (1813–1894) and Princess Elisabeth-Alexandrine von Clary-und-Aldringen (née Countess de Ficquelmont). His elder brother, Carlos succeeded their father as the 5th Prince of Clary-Aldringen, and his younger brother, Count Manfred, briefly served as Minister-President of Austria in 1899.

His paternal grandparents were Carl Joseph, 3rd Prince of Clary-Aldringen and Countess Marie "Aloisie" Chotek von Chotkow und Wognin (a daughter of Johann Rudolf Chotek von Chotkov und Vojnín). Through his paternal aunt, Mathilde Christina von Clary und Aldringen, he was a first cousin of Prussian general Prince Antoni Wilhelm Radziwiłł, who married Marie de Castellane (the daughter Henri de Castellane and Pauline de Talleyrand-Périgord). His maternal grandparents were Count Karl Ludwig von Ficquelmont and Countess Dorothea de Ficquelmont (a daughter of Count Ferdinand von Tiesenhausen).

== Career ==
Count von Clary-Aldringen entered the Austro-Hungarian foreign service in 1873 and served inter alia in Paris and St. Petersburg, following the path of his grandfather, Count Charles-Louis de Ficquelmont. From 1895 until 1897 he was counselor at the embassy in London. In 1897, he was appointed Austro-Hungarian Minister at Stuttgart succeeding the future Imperial Foreign Minister Burián von Rajecz and then from 1899 at Dresden, two of the three missions that Austria-Hungary had in Germany other than Berlin (the third one was in Munich). Although mostly maintained due to the claims of tradition, these missions were popular postings due to personal comfort and convenience and particularly the post in Dresden was generally awarded to someone enjoying the special favour of Emperor Franz Joseph I.

In December 1902, Count von Clary-Aldringen was appointed to serve as Minister at Brussels and would remain there for eleven years until 1914. Acting as the doyen of the diplomatic corps in Brussels and personally popular, it fell upon him to deliver the declaration of war on 28 August. When leaving Brussels, he handed over the legation to the U.S. Minister in Belgium, Brand Whitlock. He played no further role during the war. He and his family were close friends with William Cavendish-Bentinck, 6th Duke of Portland, and therefore often visited the Portlands in London and Welbeck Abbey.

In March 1920, he became the sixth Prince of Clary-Aldringen following his older brother Carlos' death.

== Personal life ==
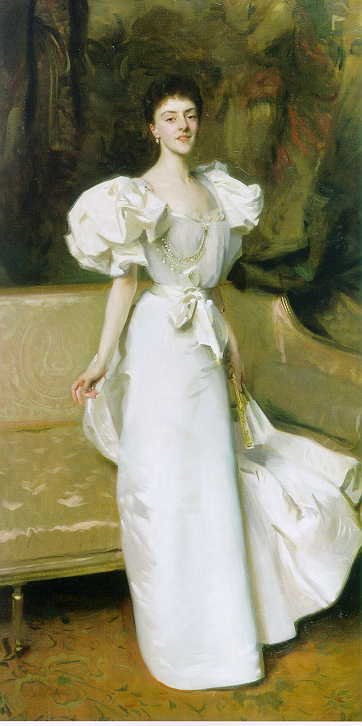
Portrait of his wife, Therese Kinsky, by John Singer Sargent, 1896

In 1885 in Vienna, he married Countess Therese Kinsky von Wchinitz und Tettau (1867–1943), the daughter of Count Friedrich Karl Kinsky von Wchinitz und Tettau and Countess Sophie von Mensdorff-Pouilly. Together, the couple had three children:

- Countess Elisalex von Clary und Aldringen (1885–1955), who married Count Henri de Baillet-Latour, the oldest son of Count Ferdinand de Baillet-Latour, former governor of the Province of Antwerp, and Countess Caroline d'Oultremont de Duras.
- Alfons Maria Edmund Friedrich Karl Joseph Aloisius Gregor von Clary und Aldringen (1887–1978), who married Countess Lidwina von und zu Eltz genannt Faust von Stromberg, a daughter of Count Johann Jacob von und zu Eltz genannt Faust von Stromberg and Princess Marie Theresia of Lobkowicz.
- Countess Sophie von Clary und Aldringen (1891–1961), who died unmarried in London.

Prince Siegfried died in Teplitz on 11 February 1929. He was succeeded by his only son, Alfons, who became the seventh prince, but lost his property in the Czechoslovak Republic in 1945.

== Bibliography ==
- Helga Peham, Siegfried Graf Clary und Aldringen (1848-1929). Leben und Wirken eines österreichisch-ungarischen Diplomaten, Vienna, 1981.

Diplomatic posts
Preceded by Stephan Burián von Rajecz	Austro-Hungarian Minister to Württemberg; 1897–1899	Succeeded by Alfons Freiherr von Pereira-Arnstein
Preceded by Heinrich Graf von Lützow zu Drey-Lützow und Seedorf	Austro-Hungarian Minister to Saxony; 1899–1902	Succeeded by Ludwig Velics von Lászlófalva
Preceded by Josef Graf Wodzicki von Granow	Austro-Hungarian Minister to Belgium; 1902–1914	Succeeded by None
