= Palais Mollard-Clary =

Coordinates: 48°12′34″N 16°21′55″E

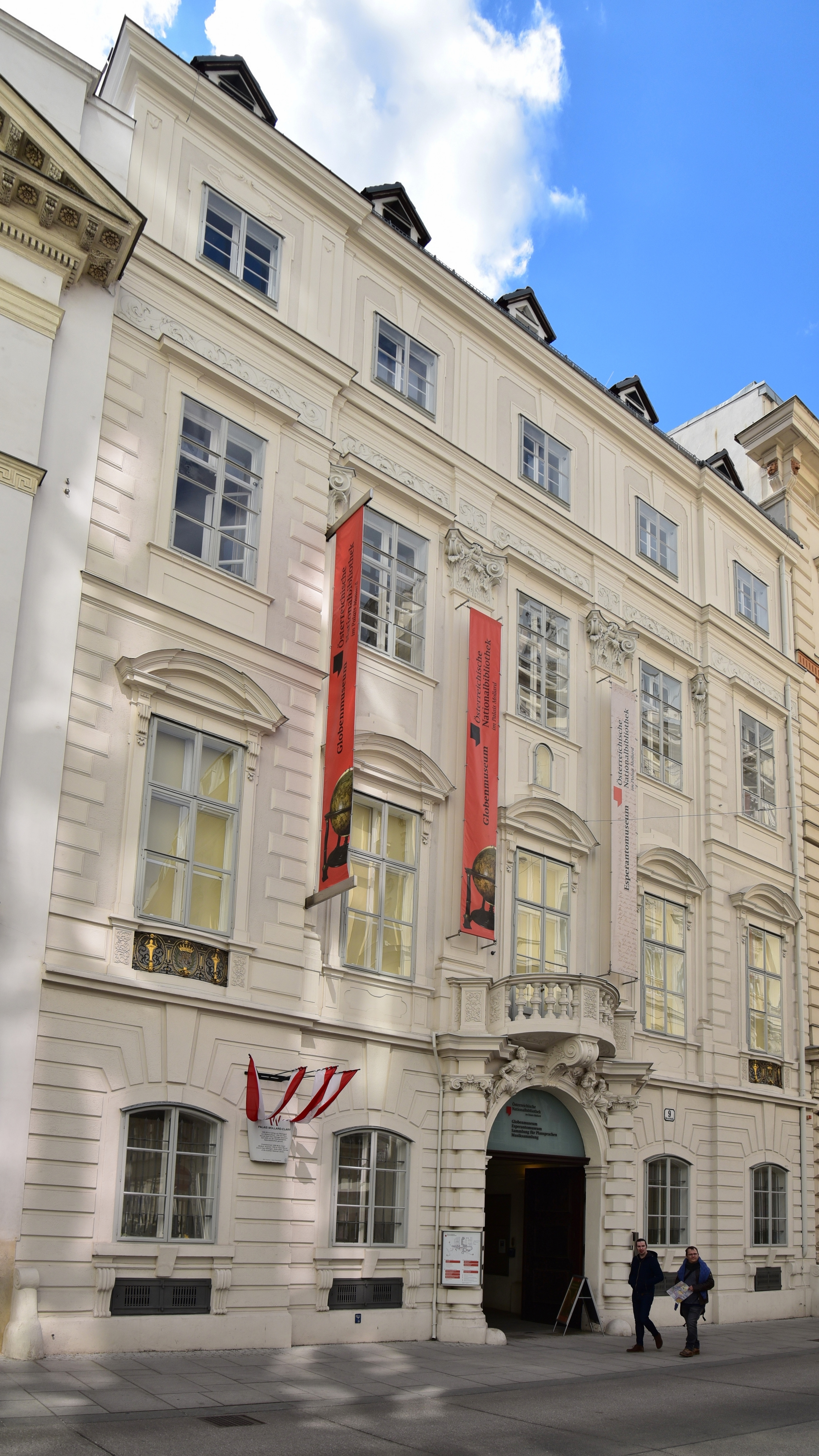
Palais Mollard-Clary.

Palais Mollard-Clary is a Baroque palace in Vienna, Austria. It is located in the first district Innere Stadt, at Herrengasse 9.

It was built from 1686 to 1689 for Imperial Count Franz Maximilian von Mollard (1621–1690). In 1760, it was bought by Count Franz Wenzel von Clary und Aldringen. Emperor Joseph II held his famous "round tables" here. Since 2005 it has been used by the Austrian National Library and houses the Globe Museum, the Department of Music and the Department of Planned Languages and Esperanto Museum.
