= Wilhelm Radziwiłł =

Polish and Prussian nobleman

- 14th Duke of Nieśwież
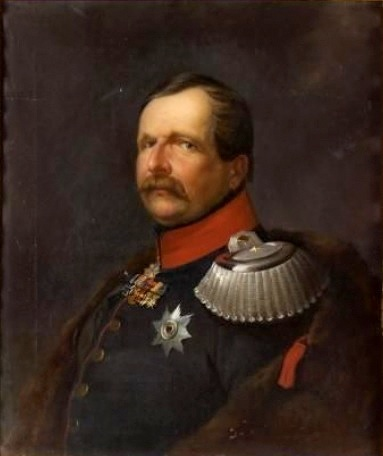
- Full name: Fryderyk Wilhelm Paweł Mikolaj Radziwiłł
- Born: 19 March 1797; Berlin, Kingdom of Prussia
- Died: 5 August 1870 (aged 73); Berlin, North German Confederation
- Spouses: Princess Helena Radziwiłł (m. 1825; died 1827) Countess Mathilde von Clary und Aldringen (m. 1832; died 1870)
- Issue: Princess Ludwika Friederike; Prince Antoni Wilhelm; Princess Matylda; Princess Ludwika; Princess Leontyna; Princess Elira; Prince Janusz; Prince Wilhelm; Princess Eufemia
- Father: Antoni Henryk Radziwiłł
- Mother: Princess Louise of Prussia

Prince Fryderyk Wilhelm Paweł Mikolaj Radziwiłł (19 March 1797 – 5 August 1870) was a Polish nobleman and Prussian general who was the founding president of the Berlin Numismatic Society.

== Early life ==
Radziwiłł was born on 19 March 1797 in Berlin. He was the eldest son of Prince Antoni Henryk Radziwiłł, the Duke-Governor (Polish: książę-namiestnik, German: Statthalter) of the Grand Duchy of Poznań, an autonomous province of the Kingdom of Prussia, and Princess Louise of Prussia (1770–1836). Among his surviving siblings were Prince Ferdynand Fryderyk Radziwiłł (who died unmarried); Princess Eliza Fryderyka Radziwiłł (the desired bride of Prince William of Prussia, who later became William I, German Emperor, but they were not allowed to marry); Prince Bogusław Fryderyk Radziwiłł (who married Countess Leontyna von Clary und Aldringen); Prince Władysław Radziwiłł (who died unmarried); and Princess Wanda Augusta Wilhelmina Radziwiłł (who married their first cousin, Prince Adam Czartoryski).

His paternal grandparents were Prince Michał Hieronim Radziwiłł and Helena Przeździecka. His aunt, Princess Angelika Radziwiłł, was the wife of Prince Konstanty Adam Czartoryski. Through his brother, Prince Bogusław, he was uncle to Prince Ferdynand Radziwiłł. His maternal grandparents were Margravine Elisabeth Louise of Brandenburg-Schwedt and Prince Augustus Ferdinand of Prussia (a younger brother of the Prussian King Frederick the Great). Through his mother, he was the great-grandson of King Frederick William I of Prussia, great-great-grandson of King George I of Great Britain, cousin of William I, German Emperor and Czar Alexander II of Russia.

Wilhelm studied at the Friedrich Wilhelm Gymnasium and the Friedrichswerder Gymnasium in Berlin.

== Career ==
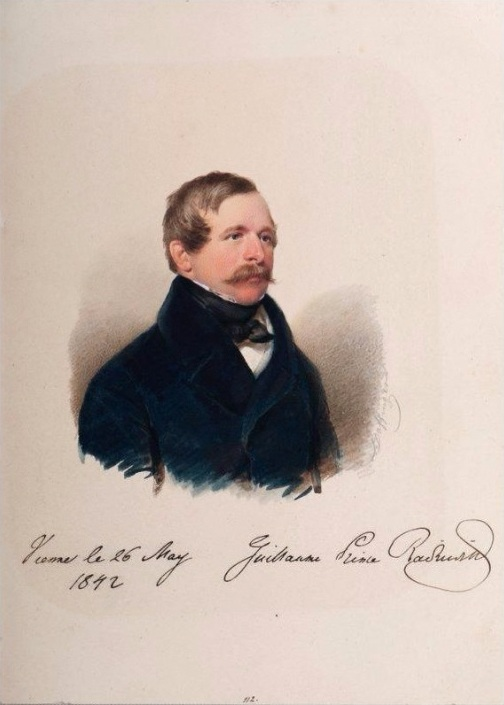
Prince Radziwiłł, by Moritz Michael Daffinger, 1842

In 1813, he enlisted as a Second lieutenant in the 3rd Army Corps under the command of Friedrich Wilhelm Freiherr von Bülow. He took part in the Battles of Leipzig and Laon, the Battles of Bois-le-Duc, Deuren, Leonhout, the Siege of Soissons and the Capture of Arnhem. He was awarded the Iron Cross, 2nd Class, and the Order of the Sword; he was promoted to captain in May 1815 and in turn assigned to the Bülow corps.

After the 1815 Treaty of Paris, he entered the Prussian Staff College with the rank of Major to improve his skills and at the same time became a member of the Military Society of Berlin. In 1821, he received his transfer as battalion commander to Poznań.

In 1829, he toured the Italian peninsula and visited Greece and Constantinople to gain an insight into the military and political situation in the crisis areas of the time. Upon his return, he was given command of the 11th Grenadier Regiment in Breslau and was promoted to Colonel in 1832.

The death of his father forced him to relinquish command and devote himself to managing his estates, in the Ołycka and Przygodzicka estates, becoming a member of the Prussian House of Lords. In 1833, he became a Knight of Honor of the Sovereign Order of Malta. As commander of the 6th Landwehr Brigade, he returned to active service in 1838. In 1839, he was promoted to Major general and in 1846, to Lieutenant general.

During the First Schleswig War, he took command of the Prussian troops under Field Marshal Friedrich Graf von Wrangel against Denmark. For his conduct at Schleswig and Düppel, he received the Order Pour le Mérite.

In 1848 he voted against the incorporation of the Grand Duchy of Posen into the German Confederation. In May 1849, he was appointed Commandant of Torgau and, in 1852, Commanding general of the 4th Army Corps in Magdeburg. In recognition of his achievements, he was appointed commander of the 27th Infantry Regiment. With the rank of General of the Infantry, he commanded the 3rd Army Corps from 1858 and held the post of military governor of the Province of Brandenburg during the mobilization of 1859.

With the reorganization of the army from 1860, he was head of the Corps of Engineers and pioneers and general inspector of Prussian fortresses.

In 1843, he was one of the founders of the Berlin Numismatic Society, the oldest numismatic association in Germany. It was an initiative of the Berlin lecturer Bernhard von Koehne, later director of the Hermitage in St. Petersburg. Radzwill served as president of the new society for several decades until his death in 1870. Chamberlain Adolf von Rauch succeeded him as president of the Society.

== Personal life ==
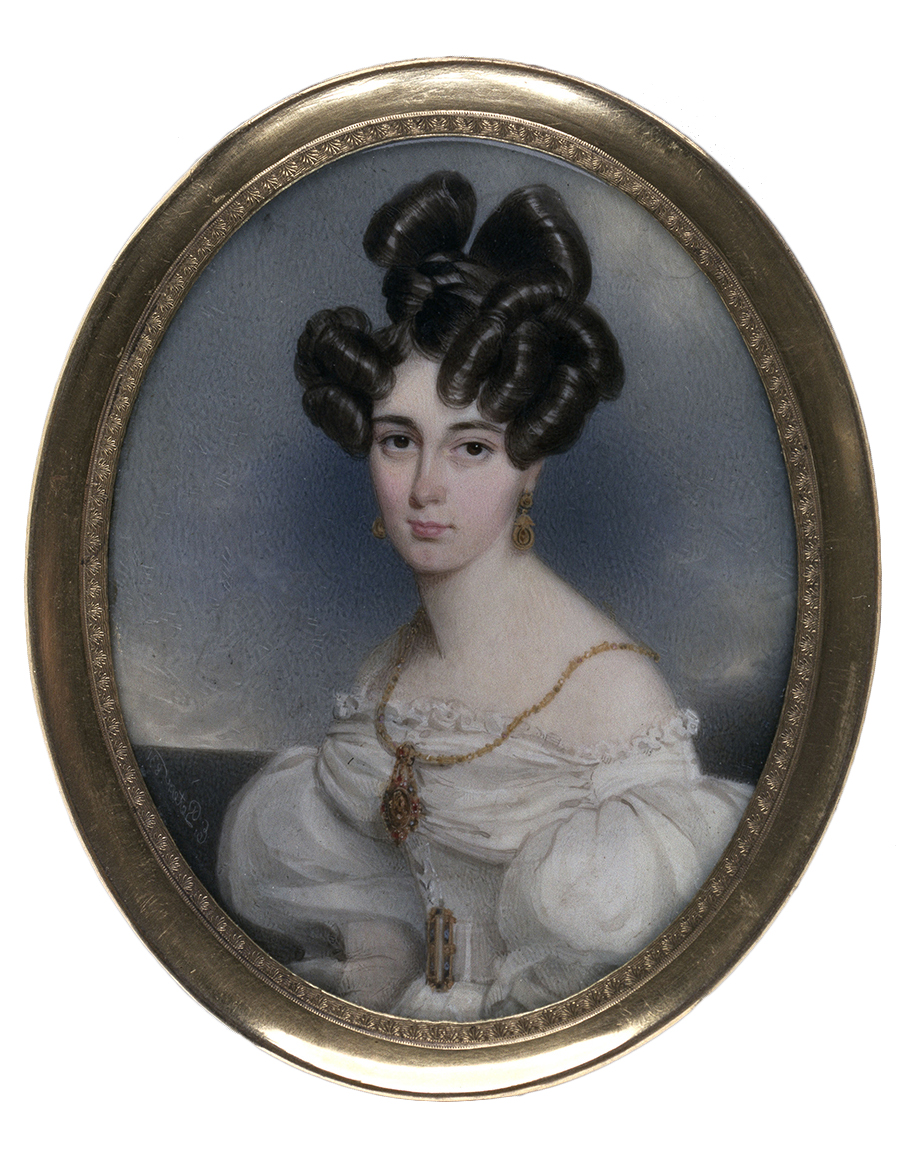
Miniatiure portrait of his second wife, Countess Mathilde Christina von Clary und Aldringen, by Emanuel Thomas Peter, 1831

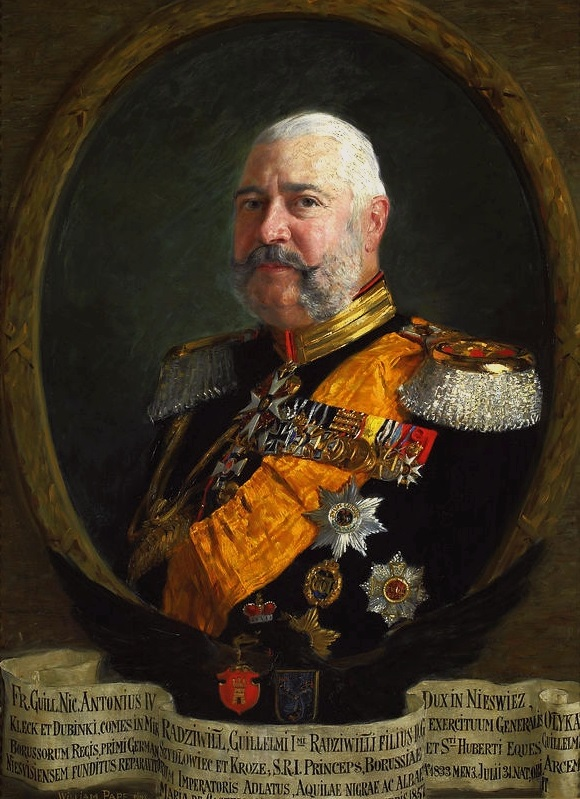
Portrait of his eldest son, Prince Antoni Wilhelm Radziwiłł, by William Pape, 1897

On 23 January 1825 in Poznań, he married his first cousin, Princess Helena Radziwiłł (1805–1827), a daughter of Prince Ludwig Nikolai Radziwill and Marianna Wodzinska. Before her death in 1827, they were the parents of one daughter:

- Princess Ludwika Friederike Wilhelmine Radziwiłł (1826–1828), who died young.

After the death of his first wife, Radziwiłł married his brother's sister-in-law, Countess Mathilde Christina von Clary und Aldringen (1806–1896) on 4 June 1832 at Tepkitz. Countess Mathilde was a daughter of Carl Joseph, 3rd Prince of Clary-Aldringen and Marie "Aloisie" Chotek von Chotkow und Wognin. Together, they were the parents of the following children:

- Prince Friedrich Wilhelm Antoni Radziwiłł (1833–1904), a Prussian general; he married Marie de Castellane, the daughter Henri de Castellane and Pauline de Talleyrand-Périgord, in 1857.
- Princess Friedericke Wilhelmine Luise Marianne Matylda Radziwiłł (1836–1918), who married, as his second wife, Prince Hugo Alfred von Windisch-Graetz, son of Weriand, 1st Prince of Windisch-Graetz and Princess Maria Eleonore Karolina von Lobkowicz, in 1867.
- Princess Ludwika Radziwiłł (1838–1876), who died unmarried in Egypt.
- Princess Luise Marianne Auguste Elżbieta Leontyna Radziwiłł (1839–1857), who died unmarried.
- Princess Léonie Wanda August Elira Radziwiłł (1841–1869), who died unmarried.
- Prince Fryderyk Wilhelm Janusz Radziwiłł (1843–1923), a Prussian Rittmeister; he married Maria Mostowska in 1887.
- Prince Adam Karol Wilhelm Radziwiłł (1845–1911), a Prussian major and Russian chamberlain; he married Catherine Rzewuska, in 1873.
- Princess Eufemia Radziwiłł (1850–1877), who married Count Michal Rzyszczewski in 1874.

After recovering from a stroke in 1864, Radziwiłł retired in 1866. The prince died in 1870 in his Berlin Palace at Wilhelmstraße 77 and was later buried in the family mausoleum at Antoninus Pfalz. In 1875, Radziwiłł Palace was sold to the German Empire for two million thalers. From then on, it served as the official residence of the Imperial Chancellor.

== Honors and awards ==
Radziwiłł was made an honorary citizen of Magdeburg in 1858. After his death in 1889, the 1st Pioneer Battalion was given the nickname "Prince Radziwiłł." In addition, Radziwiłł received the following medals and decorations:

- Order of St. Vladimir, 4th Class, 1814
- Order of Saint Hubert, 28 June 1825
- Order of the Red Eagle, 1st Class with Oak Leaves, 10 September 1840
- Russian Order of Saint Anna, 1st Class, 17 September 1843
- Grand Cross of the Order of Leopold, 21 December 1852
- Grand Cross of the Order of the White Falcon, 18 October 1853
- Grand Cross of the Order of Henry the Lion, 17 November 1853
- Grand Cross of the Order of Albert the Bear, 10 February 1855
- Diamonds for the Order of the Black Eagle, 15 October 1861

== Ancestry ==
Ancestors of Wilhelm Radziwiłł

16. Prince Jan Mikołaj Radziwiłł
8. Prince Marcin Mikołaj Radziwłł
17. Dorota Henryka Przebendowska
4. Prince Michał Hieronim Radziwiłł
18. Jan Trębicki
9. Marta Trębicka
19. Teresa Telszewska
2. Prince Antoni Radziwiłł
20. Aleksander Przeździecki
10. Antoni Tadeusz Przeździecki
21. Constancia-Alexandra Kaminska
5. Helena Przeździecka
22. Prince Józef Ogiński
11. Katarzyna Ogińska
23. Princess Anna Wiśniowiecka
1. Wilhelm Radziwiłł
24. Frederick I of Prussia
12. Frederick William I of Prussia
25. Sophia Charlotte of Hanover
6. Prince Augustus Ferdinand of Prussia
26. George I of Great Britain
13. Princess Sophia Dorothea of Hanover
27. Duchess Sophia Dorothea of Celle
3. Princess Louise of Prussia
28. Philip William, Margrave of Brandenburg-Schwedt
14. Frederick William, Margrave of Brandenburg-Schwedt
29. Princess Johanna Charlotte of Anhalt-Dessau
7. Margravine Elisabeth Louise of Brandenburg-Schwedt
30. Frederick William I of Prussia (= 12)
15. Princess Sophia Dorothea of Prussia
31. Princess Sophia Dorothea of Hanover (= 13)
