= Count Manfred von Clary-Aldringen =

Austro-Hungarian nobleman and statesman

Durchlaucht Manfred Graf von Clary-und-Aldringen
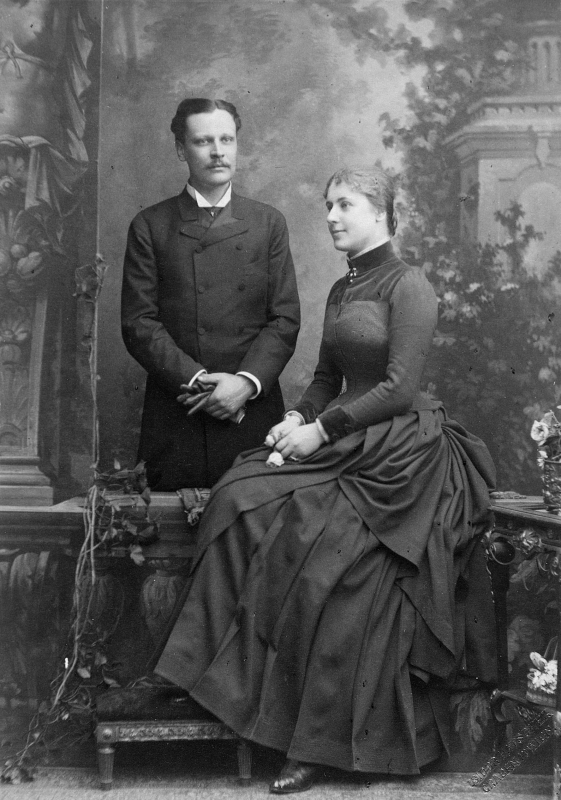

Minister-President of Austria
- In office 2 October 1899 – 21 December 1899
- Monarch: Franz Joseph I of Austria
- Preceded by: Franz Fürst von Thun und Hohenstein
- Succeeded by: Heinrich Ritter von Wittek

Personal details
- Born: 30 May 1852 Palais Mollard-Clary, Vienna, Austro-Hungarian Empire
- Died: 12 February 1929 (aged 76) Salzburg, Republic of Austria
- Spouse: Countess Franziska Pejácsevich von Veröcze
- Education: University of Vienna

Count Manfred von Clary-Aldringen (30 May 1852 Palais Mollard-Clary, Vienna – 12 February 1928 Castle Herrnau, Salzburg) was an Austro-Hungarian nobleman and statesman. He served as the 16th Minister-President of Cisleithania (therefore the 28th Minister-President of Austria overall).

== Biography ==
=== Family ===
He was born into a prominent Austro-Hungarian princely family of Bohemian origin (the Clary-Aldringens), the son of Fürst (prince) Edmund Moritz and Fürstin (princess) Elisabeth-Alexandrine von Clary-und-Aldringen (born countess de Ficquelmont). He was the younger brother of Fürst Siegfried (1848–1929), a prominent Austro-Hungarian diplomat, and the grandson of Count Charles-Louis de Ficquelmont (1777–1857), 2nd Minister-President of the Austrian Empire.

In 1884, in Vienna, he married Gräfin (countess) Franziska Pejácsevich von Veröcze. She was the heiress of one of the most powerful families of the Croatian nobility, descending from the princes Esterházy von Galántha. The couple had two children.

=== Political career ===
Count Clary-und-Aldringen studied law at the University of Vienna before starting his political career. The Austro-Hungarian Empire was dominated by a small circle of high nobility families that had great power and enormous riches and thus played a major role in politics and diplomacy. Count Manfred is an example of such an influence.

On 22 February 1896, he became Governor of the Länd of Austrian Silesia, a key office in a strategic region for the Empire: not only was the Länd rich in natural resource, it also lay at the border with both the German and Russian Empires. Austrian Silesia was involved in the long power struggle between these three empires and a subject of central European irredentisms.

In 1898, Count Manfred became Governor of the Länd of Styria and its representative in the Reischrat ("Imperial Council"). This was office of major importance, which he held until the fall of the Empire in 1918. Styria was one of the powerhouses of the Austro-Hungarian economy: the Länd was a centre of industry and agriculture, and its capital Graz was one of the Empire's most populous cities.

From 2 October to 21 December 1899, Count Clary-und-Aldringen served as Minister-President of Austria, following in the steps of his grandfather, Count Charles-Louis de Ficquelmont.

=== Later life ===
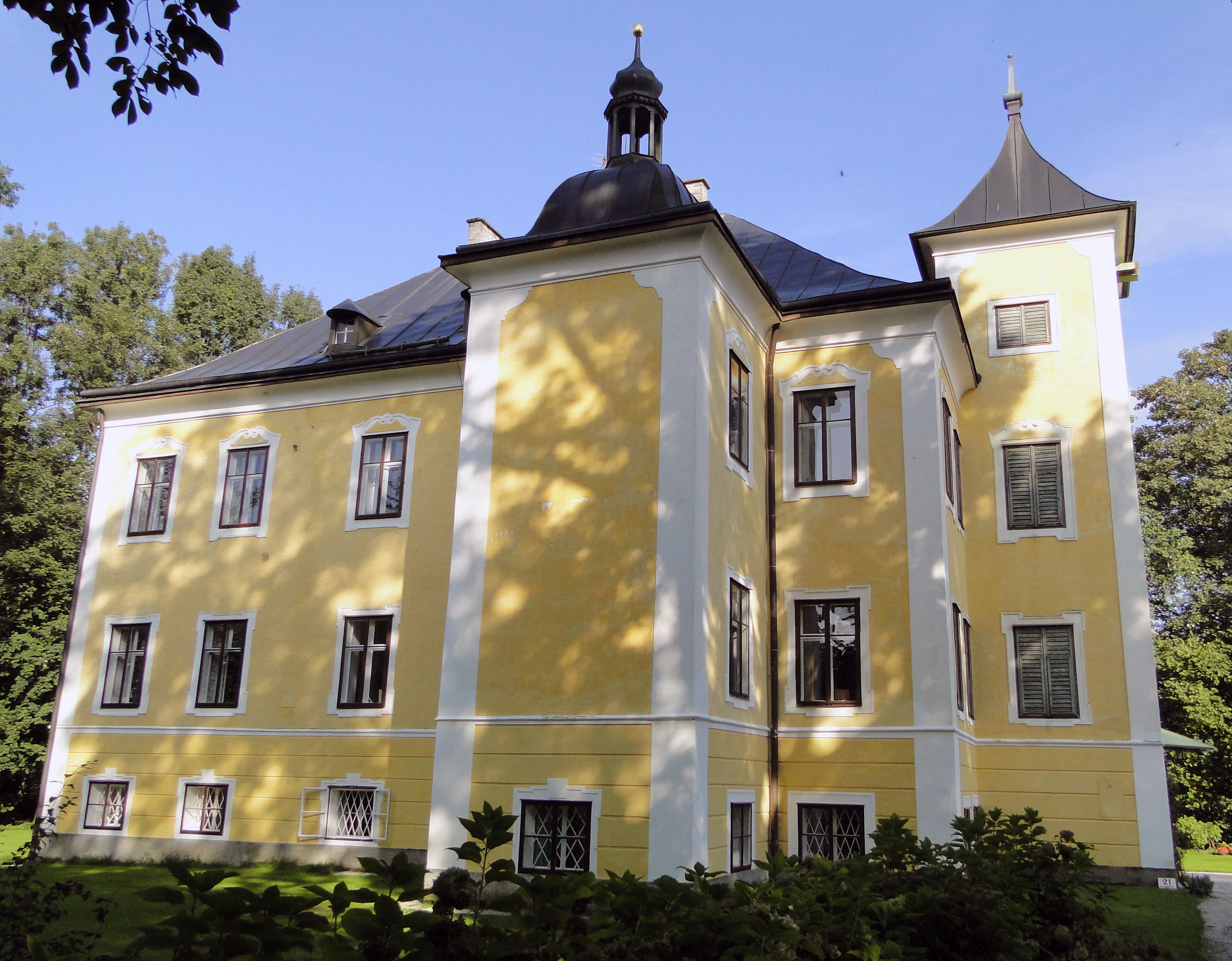
Herrnau castle, Salzburg

After the fall of the Austro-Hungarian Empire following the defeat of the Central Powers during the autumn of 1918, Count Manfred resigned from all his official offices and spent his remaining years on his estates in Austria and Czechia (Teplice).

On 12 February 1928, Count Manfred von Clary-und-Aldringen died in his Salzburg residence of Schoss Herrnau (Herrnau Castle).

Count Clary und Aldringen is widely seen as a modernizer and has been regarded as both one of the most prominent statesmen of the end of the Austro-Hungarian Empire and a symbol of the influence of the Austro-Hungarian high nobility in politics at the turn of the 19th century.

He is also well known for having successfully fought tuberculosis when he was president of the Austrian Red Cross in Cisleithania.

== Honours ==
- Austria-Hungary:
  - Knight of the Order of Franz Joseph, 1890
  - Knight of the Iron Crown, 1st Class, 1905
  - Grand Cross of the Imperial Order of Leopold, 1915
  - War Cross for Civil Merits, 1st Class
  - Merit Star of the Decoration for Services to the Red Cross, with War Decoration
  - Jubilee Cross for Civil State Officials
  - Bronze Jubilee Medal for the Armed Forces
  - Jubilee Medal for Civil State Officials
- Spain: Knight of the Order of Charles III

== See also ==
- The House of Clary-Aldringen
- Minister-President of Austria

== Bibliography ==
- "Clary-Aldringen, Manfred Gf.". In: Österreichisches Biographisches Lexikon 1815–1950 (ÖBL). Vol. 1, Austrian Academy of Sciences, Vienna 1957, p. 149.
- Ableitinger, Alfred: Badeni – Thun – Clary-Aldringen – Eulenburg. Das österreichische Regierungssystem in der Krise der Jahre 1897–1899. In: Gernot Peter Obersteiner (Hrsg.): Festschrift Gerhard Pferschy zum 70. Geburtstag. Historische Landeskommission für Steiermark, Graz 2000, ISBN 3-901251-15-4, S. 327–349.
- Flooh-Wagnes, Elma: Manfred Graf Clary und Aldringen. Der letzte k. k. Statthalter in Steiermark. Sein Leben und Wirken. Graz 1952
