= Clary-Aldringen family =

Austro-Hungarian princely family

Clary-Aldringen
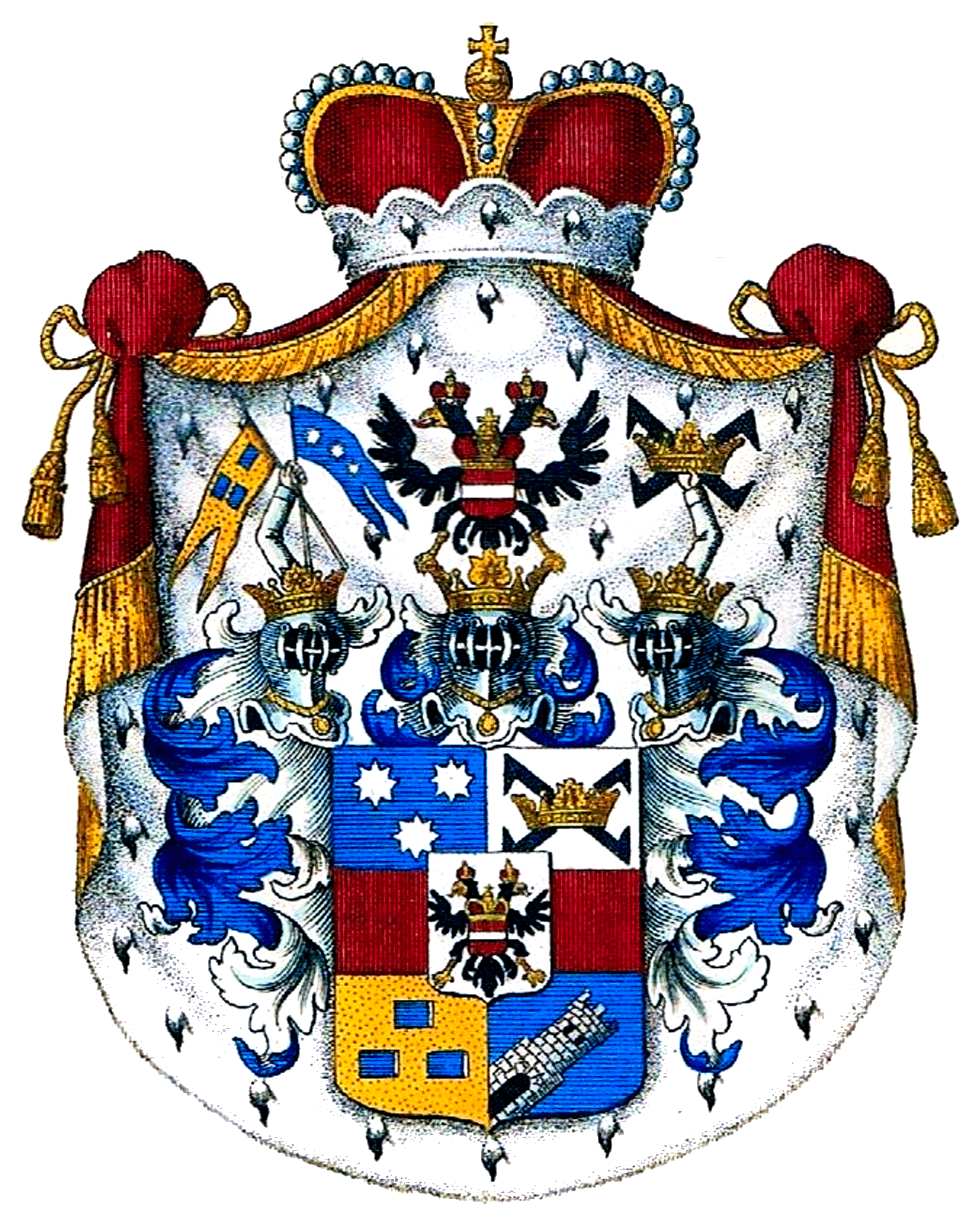
- Country: Holy Roman Empire; Austrian Empire; Austria-Hungary
- Founded: 1634
- Founder: Hieronymus von Clary; Anna Maria von Aldringen
- Current head: Hieronymus, 9th Prince of Clary-Aldringen (b. 1944)
- Titles: Counts of the Holy Roman Empire; Princes of the Holy Roman Empire; Austro-Hungarian Princes

The Clary-Aldringen family, also known as Clary und Aldringen, is one of the most prominent princely families of Austria-Hungary. Originally from Friuli, Northern Italy, one branch of the family moved to the County of Tyrol around 1500 and to the Kingdom of Bohemia around 1600, where it became one of the leading families of the Bohemian nobility. It produced several notable Austro-Hungarian statesmen, military officers and diplomats.

== Origin ==
The Clario de Riva family were lords of Riva del Garda. One brother moved to the neighboring County of Tyrol around 1500, in the service of Emperor Maximilian I, the other brother sided with the emperor's enemy, the Republic of Venice, and remained in the Friuli province where his descendants later extinguished.

Franz von Clary moved from Tyrol to the Kingdom of Bohemia and acquired the Dobříčany estates at Liběšice in 1622/1623, a property confiscated from protestants that were banned from Bohemia. Some Tyrolian possessions also remained in the family. His son Hieronymus von Clary married Countess Anna Maria von Aldringen, sister and heiress of the Thirty Years War's Austrian general Count Johann von Aldringen, in 1622. Their descendants were allowed by imperial decree to adopt the name and arms of both families. Ever since, the family has been known as Clary-Aldringen (or Clary und Aldringen).

== History ==
The princes of Clary-Aldringen have been one of the most prominent families of the Austrian Empire and the Kingdom of Bohemia.

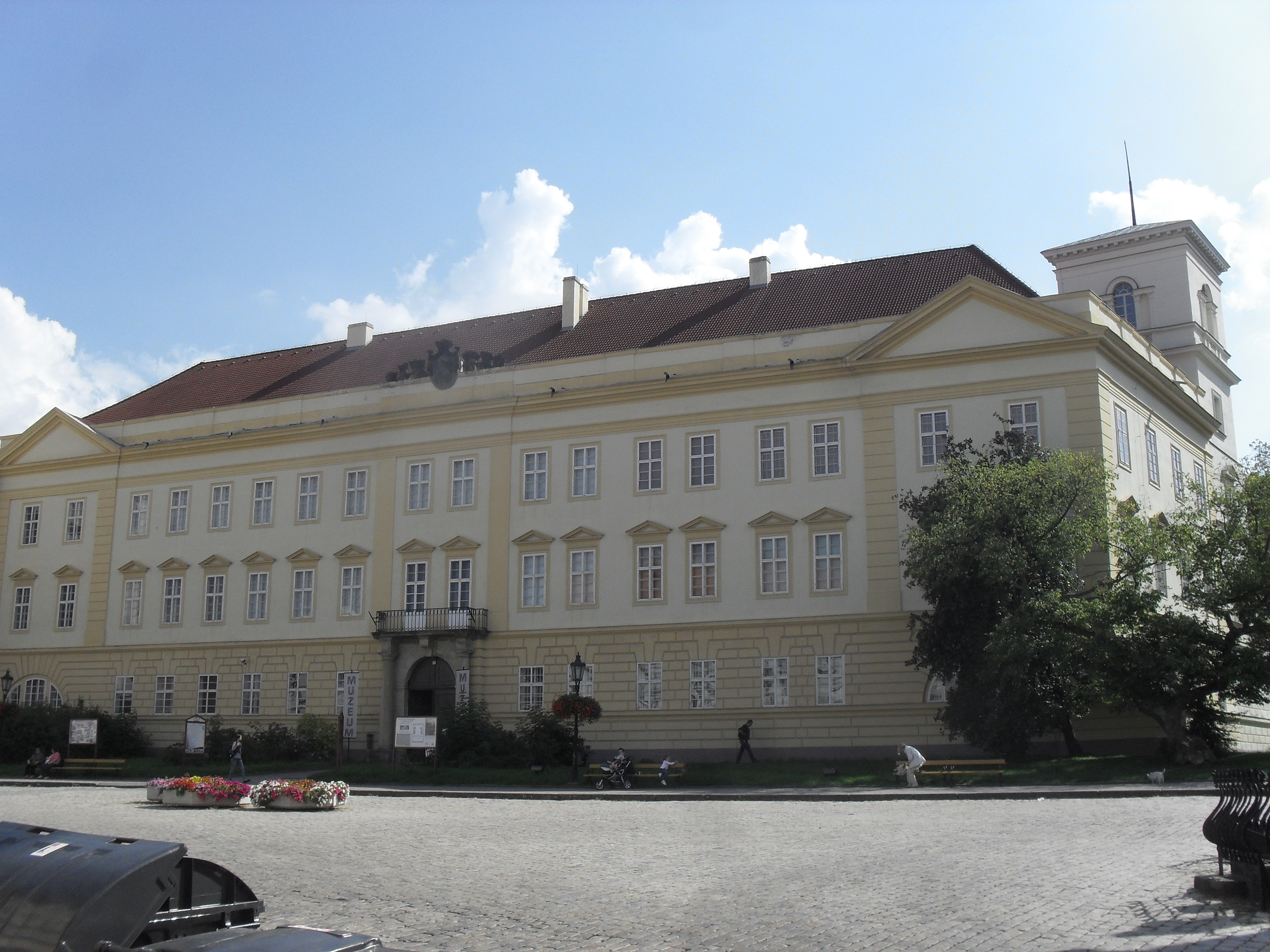
Teplice (Teplitz) Palace, main residence of the family from 1634 to 1945.

The rise of the family started when Franz von Clary left his ancestral lands in Tyrol to settle in the Kingdom of Bohemia. In 1623, Clary bought properties in the Ústí nad Labem region. However, it was the inheritance of Johann von Aldringen's estates through Franz's son's wife, Anna Maria von Aldringen, that made the Clary-Aldringens one of the most influential and wealthy Bohemian noble families. The Aldringens were a catholic noble family from the Spanish Netherlands. In 1634, Johann von Aldringen had received from Emperor Ferdinand II the ownership of lands in and around the wealthy city of Teplitz (Teplice), shortly before confiscated from the protestant count Vilém Kinský who had been assassinated together with Wallenstein, with Aldringen being one of the plotters of this murder. However, Aldringen died in a battle the same year, without issue. After some inheritance quarrels among his siblings, Emperor Ferdinand II recognized his sister Anna Maria as heiress of the Teplice estates. Since then, the Clary-Aldringens were the most powerful nobles of the Sudetes, the German speaking northern parts of Bohemia. Consequently, the rise of the family sped up and, in 1666, the Clary-Aldringens were raised to the rank of Count of the Holy Roman Empire by Emperor Joseph I.

In 1767, Reichsgraf Wenzel of Clary-Aldringen, the Imperial Treasurer (and Emperor Joseph II's private council member), was raised to princely rank. Members of the family became hereditary members of the Austrian Reichsrat (Imperial Council). From that date, the princely title of Fürst (Prince) of Clary-Aldringen was borne by the head of the family, who was styled as Durchlaucht (Serene Highness). Junior members bore the title of Graf (Count) or Gräfin (Countess) of Clary-Aldringen and were styled as Erlaucht (Illustrious Highness).

During the Napoleonic Wars, the family's Teplitz castle was the headquarters of the Sixth Coalition against Napoleon, uniting the monarchs of Austria, Prussia and Russia. There was first signed the triple alliance against Napoleon I that led to the coalition victory at the nearby Battle of Kulm and eventually instated the Holy Alliance, officially signed in Paris on September 26, 1815.

In 1832, two sisters of Prince Edmund (1813–1894) married into the Radziwiłł family, Mathilde (1806–1896) married Prince Wilhelm Radziwiłł (1797-1870), a son of Louise of Prussia, while her younger sister Leontine (1811-1890) married Wilhelm's younger brother, Prince Bogusław Fryderyk Radziwiłł. During the 19th century, the family hosted royalty several times at their Teplitz castle: in 1835, they received King Frederick William III of Prussia, Emperor Nicholas I of Russia and Emperor Franz I of Austria, hosting a ceremony in memory of the treaty of the Sixth Coalition; in 1849, they received Emperor Franz Joseph of Austria and Kings Frederick William IV of Prussia and Frederick-August II of Saxony; in 1860, they received Emperor Franz Joseph of Austria and the Prince-Regent William of Prussia.

During the late 19th century, the princely family maintained great influence within the Austrian nobility. It thus played an important role in politics and diplomacy, as illustrated by the two younger brothers of Prince Carlos (1844–1920), Austro-Hungarian diplomat Prince Siegfried (1848–1929) and his brother, the Minister-President of Austria Count Manfred (1852–1928).

Siegfried's son Alfons (1887–1978) became the seventh prince, and took over the management of the family estate in 1920, after the Kingdom of Bohemia had become part of the First Czechoslovak Republic. He lost several thousand hectares in a land-reform, but redeveloped the family enterprises, including a brewery, spa resorts, restaurants, a coal mine, two sawmills, brickworks, lime works and a woodworking factory. However he lost his Bohemian ancestral estates through communist confiscation in 1945. Following the expulsion of Germans from Czechoslovakia, the family has since lived in Frankfurt, Germany, and in Venice, Italy. Since March 2007, the head of the family is Hieronymus, 9th Prince of Clary-Aldringen (born 1944).

== Notable members ==
- Reichsgraf Johann von Aldringen (1584–1634), commandant of the Austrian army during the Thirty Years War
- Prince Wenzel of Clary-Aldringen, first Prince of Clary-Aldringen
- Princess Elizabeth-Alexandrine of Clary-Aldringen, née Countess de Ficquelmont, daughter of Count Charles-Louis and Countess Dorothea de Ficquelmont, née Tiesenhausen
- Prince Siegfried von Clary-Aldringen (1848–1929), prominent Austro-Hungarian diplomat, son of the above
- Count Manfred von Clary-Aldringen (1852–1928), Austro-Hungarian statesman, Governor of the Austrian imperial lands of Silesia and Styria, minister-president of the Austrian part of the Empire (1889), and brother of the above

== Princes of Clary-Aldringen ==
- Franz Wenzel Philipp Joseph of Clary-Aldringen (1706–1788), 1st Prince
  - Johann Nepomuk Joseph Anton Dominik Cazavus of Clary-Aldringen (1753–1826), 2nd Prince
    - Carl Joseph of Clary-Aldringen (1777–1831), 3rd Prince
      - Edmund Moritz Blasius Peregrinus of Clary-Aldringen (1813–1894), 4th Prince
        - Maria Carlos Borromäus Joseph Richard Franz Sales Johann Nepomuk of Clary-Aldringen (1844–1920), 5th Prince
        - Siegfried Carl Maria Callistus Franz of Clary-Aldringen (1848–1929), 6th Prince
          - Alfons Maria Edmund Friedrich Karl Joseph Aloisius Gregor of Clary-Aldringen (1887–1978), 7th Prince
            - Johann Georg Marcus Erwein Maria Ägidius Augustinus of Clary-Aldringen (1919–2007), 8th Prince
              - Hieronymus Maria Alfons Hans Ulrich Siegfried Josef Antonio of Clary-Aldringen (b. 1944), 9th Prince

== Residences ==
The Clary-Aldringens were great landowners, possessing enormous estates in Bohemia, Tyrol and Lower Austria.

The most important of all of their estates was that of Tepliz, which comprised the eponymous city as well as more than 70 towns and villages. It was one of the largest noble estates of the Sudetes and one of the largest private properties of Bohemia before its confiscation according to the Beneš decrees.

In consequence, the Clary-Aldringens had many residences, the grandest being:

- Schloss Teplice (Teplice Palace), the primary seat of the family from the 16th century until its confiscation in 1945;
- Palais Mollard-Clary, the family palace in Vienna (sold in 1922);
- Palazzo Clary in Venice, to this day owned by the present prince;
- Schloss Herrnau (Herrnau Castle) in Salzburg, to this day owned by a younger branch of the counts of Clary-Aldringen.

Dubí's St-Mary's Church was built on the order of the Clary-Aldringens between 1898 and 1906 as a copy of the Venice church Santa Maria dell'Orto, to become their new family church.

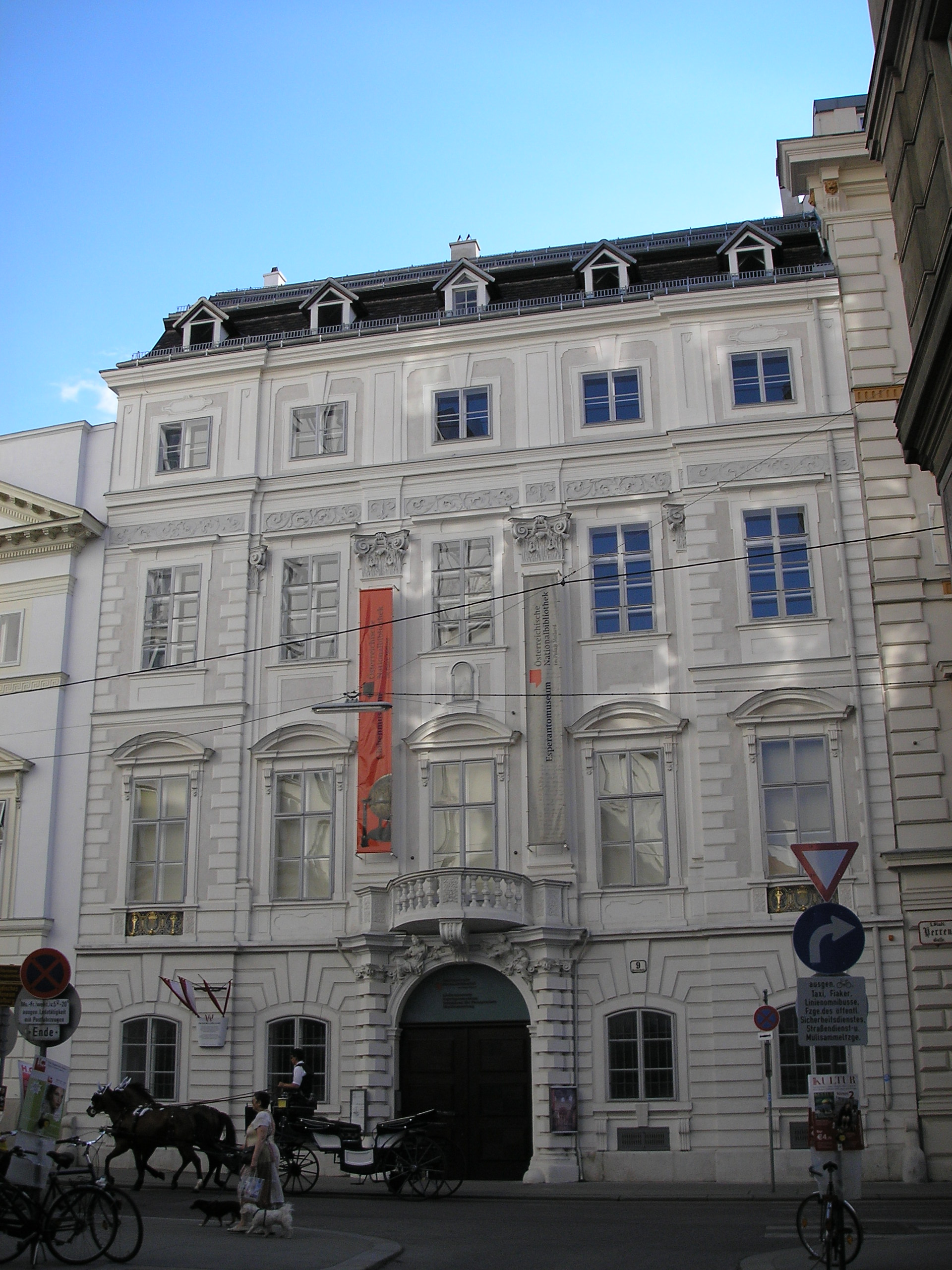
Clary-Aldringen Palace in Vienna

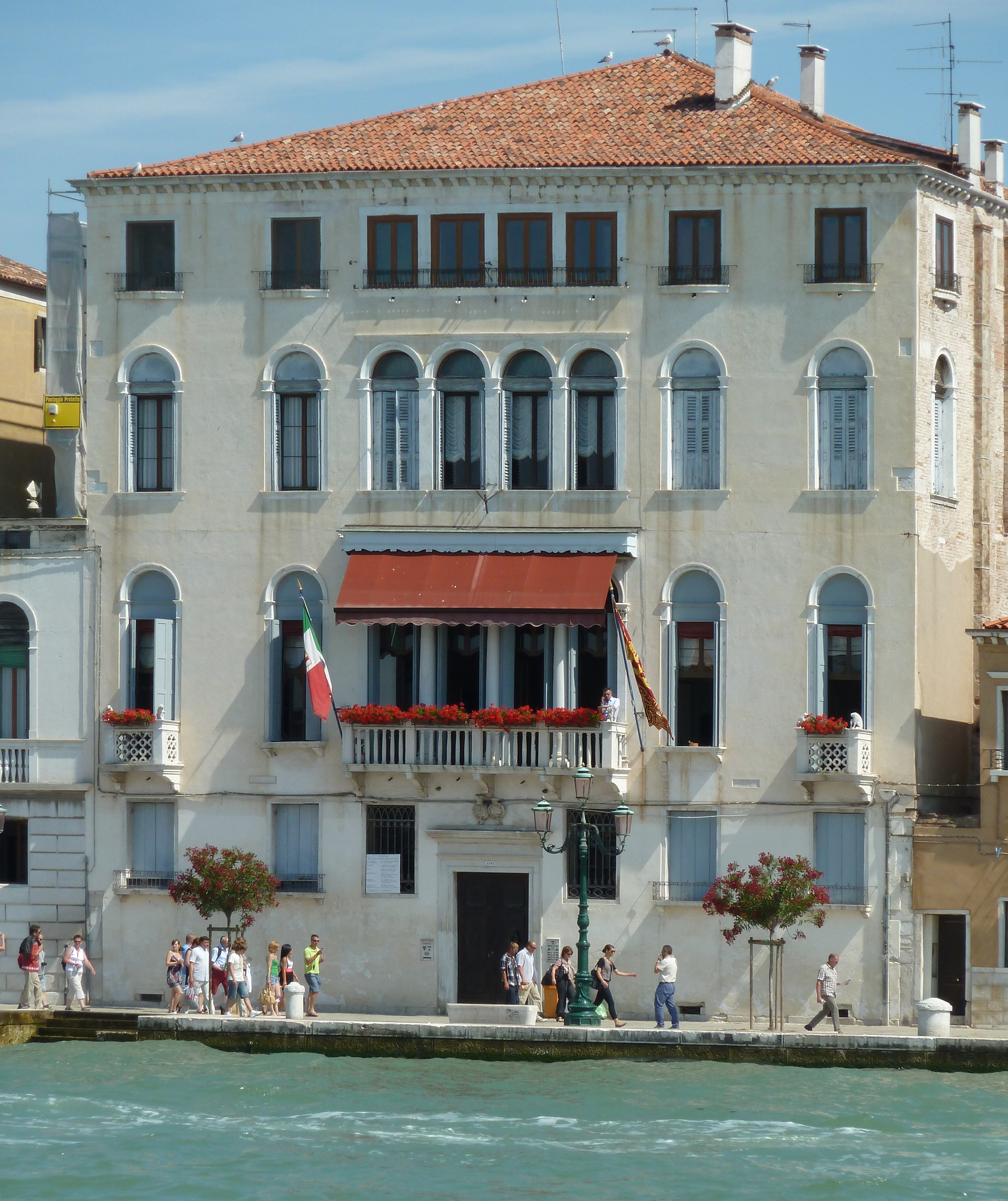
Palazzo Clary, Venice

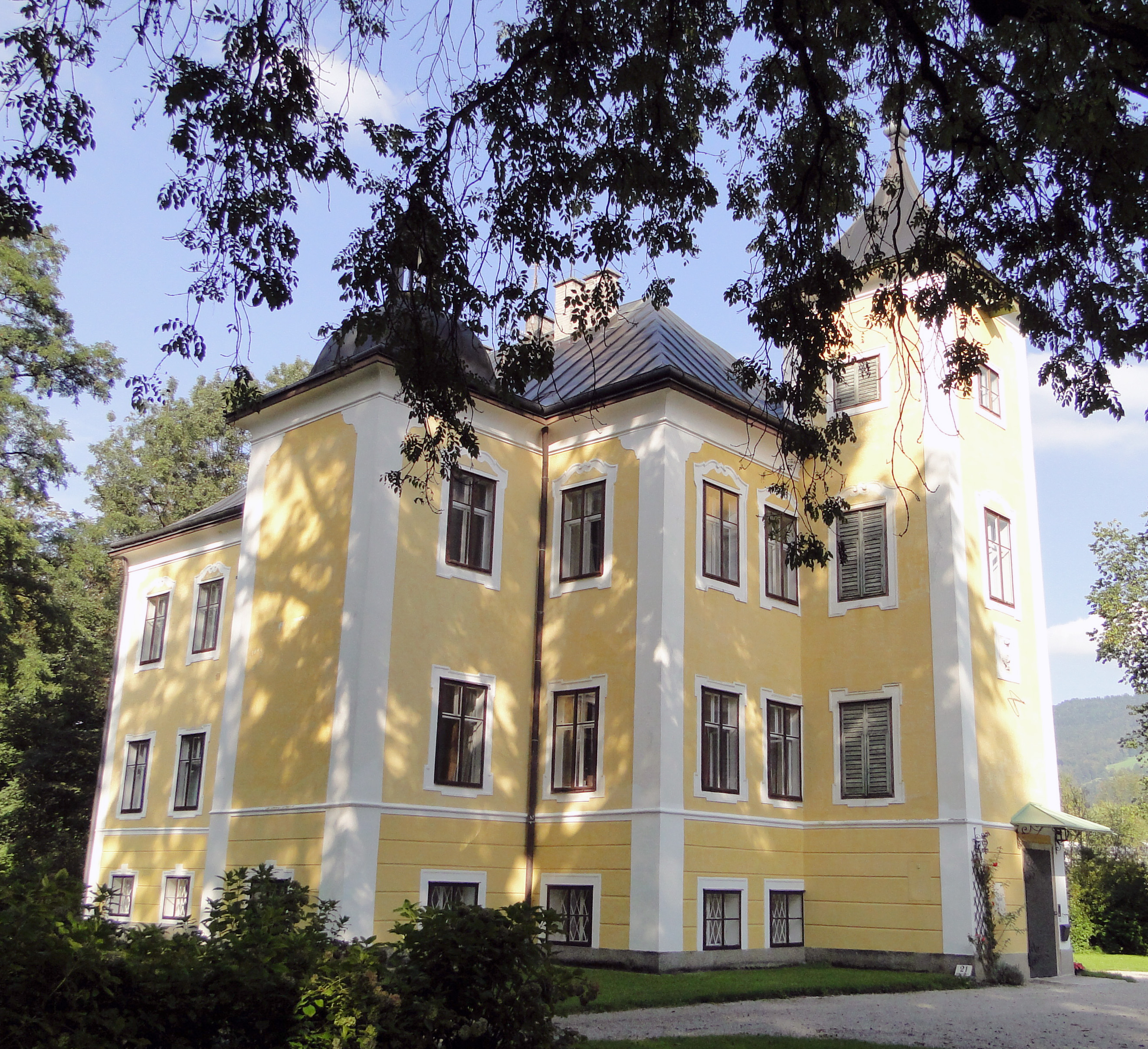
Herrnau castle, Salzburg

== Marriages ==
The Clary-Aldringen family is related by marriage to many other prominent families, including the following: Radziwill, Glam Gallas, Mensdorff-Pouilly, Ficquelmont, Pejácsevich, Baillet-Latour, Kinsky, Eltz, Donnersmarck, and Hohenzollern[-Hechingen].

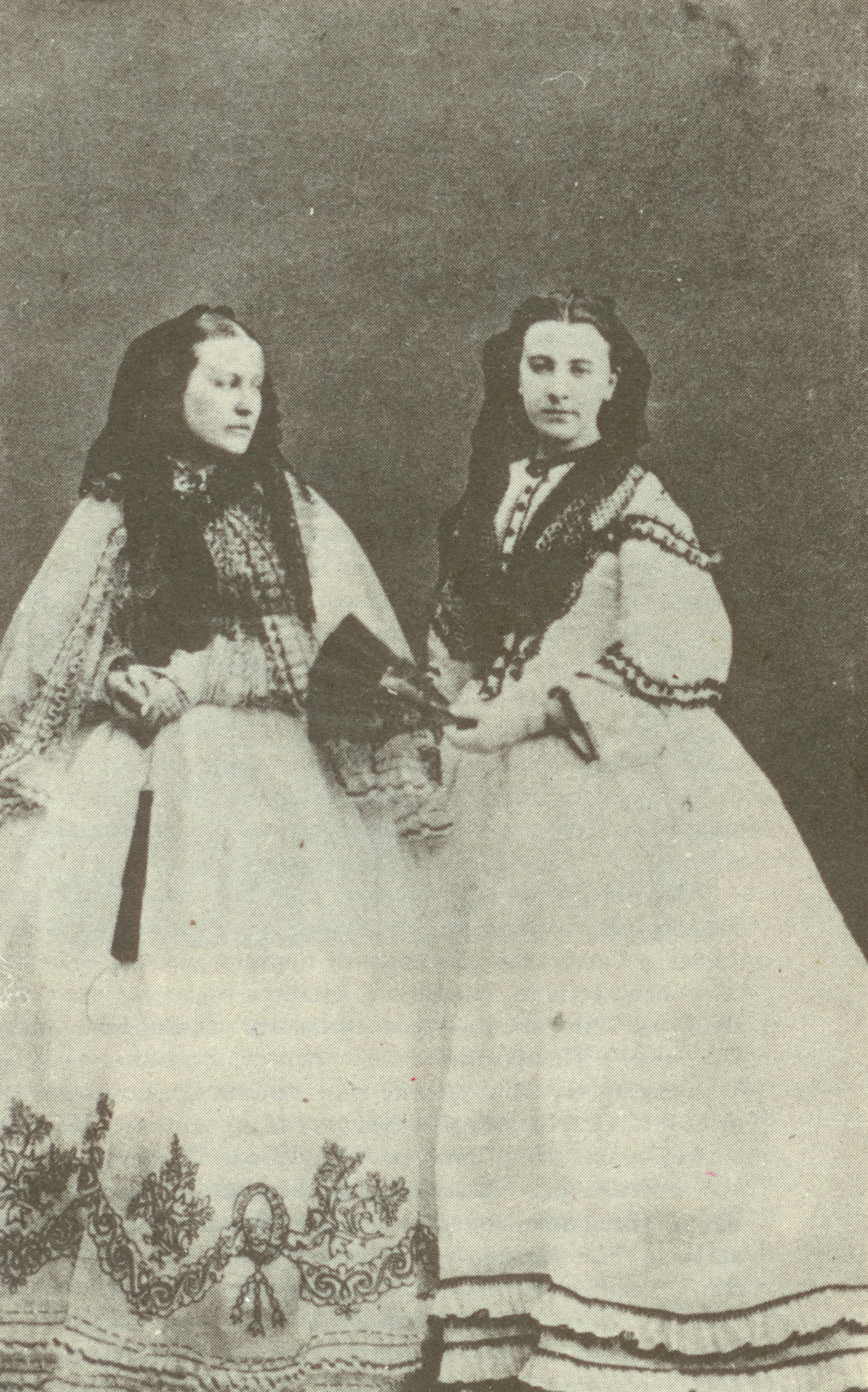
Elisabeth-Alexandrine de Ficquelmont, princess von Clary-Aldringen and her daughter, Edmée, countess di Robilant e Cereaglio

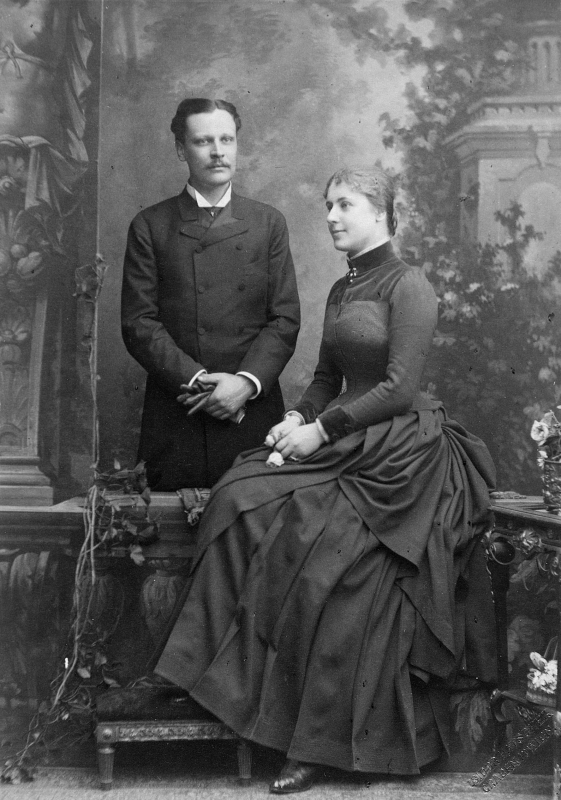
Count Manfred von Clary-Aldringen
