= Antoni Wilhelm Radziwiłł =

Polish-Lithuanian nobleman and Prussian military general

Fürst Antoni Wilhelm Radziwiłł
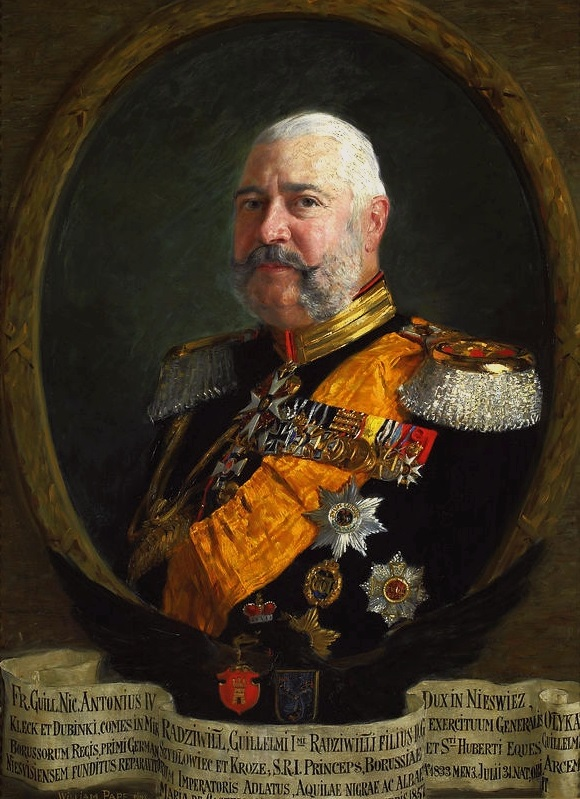
- Portrait of Prince Radziwiłł, by William Pape, 1897
- Born: 31 March 1833; Teplice, Austrian Empire
- Died: 16 December 1904 (aged 71); Berlin, German Empire
- Military career
- Allegiance: Kingdom of Prussia; German Empire
- Branch: Royal Prussian Army; Imperial German Army
- Rank: General of the Artillery
- Conflicts: Austro-Prussian War; Franco-Prussian War
- Awards: Order of the Black Eagle; Order of the Red Eagle; Iron Cross

Prince Antoni Wilhelm Radziwiłł (Polish: Fryderyk Wilhelm Ferdynand Antoni Radziwiłł; 31 March 1833 – 16 December 1904) was a member of the Polish-Lithuanian nobility and a General of the Artillery in the Prussian Army. He was the nephew of Princess Elisa Radziwiłł, the first love of their kinsman King William I of Prussia, who would later become the first German Emperor.

== Early life ==
Born the eldest son of Prince Wilhelm Paweł Radziwiłł (1797–1870), a General of the Infantry in the Prussian Army, and his second wife Countess Mathilde of Clary und Aldringen (1806–1896), Antoni was a descendant of the powerful magnate House of Radziwiłł, who owned large estates in Silesia and Posen, as well as Russia; his uncle was the Polish statesman Prince Bogusław Fryderyk Radziwiłł. He was also related to the Prussian royal family through King Frederick William I, whose granddaughter Princess Louise was married to Antoni's grandfather Antoni Henryk, Governor of Posen.

== Career ==
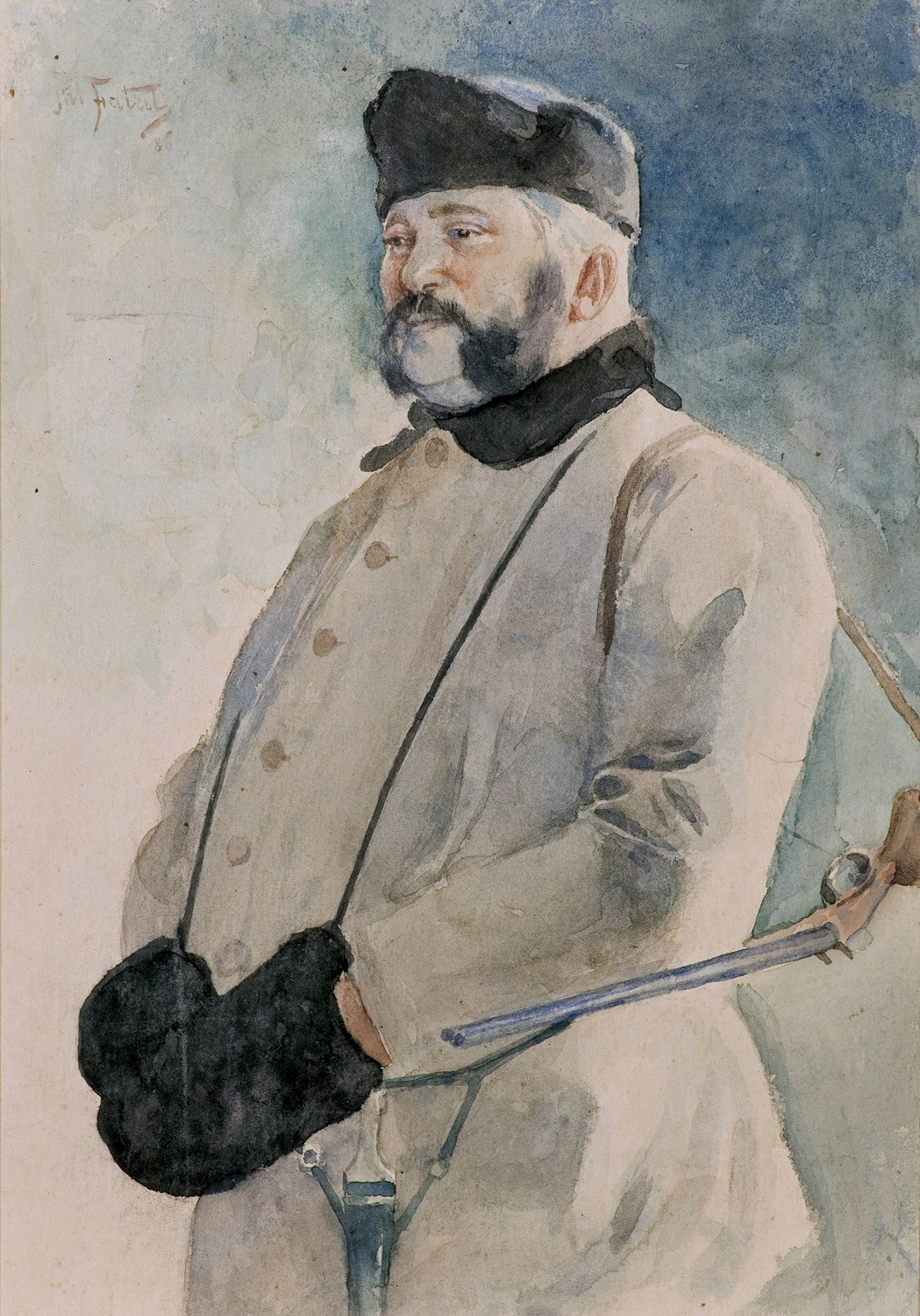
Watercolor of Prince Radziwiłł

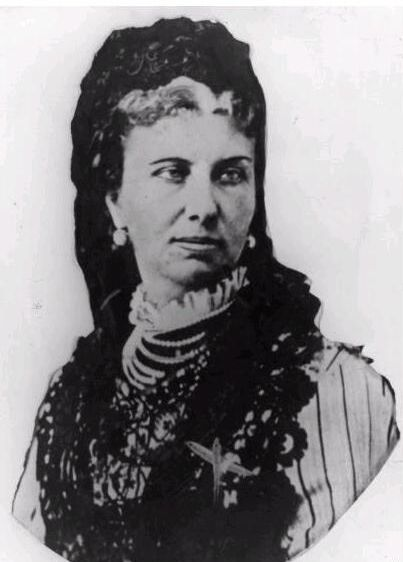
His wife, Marie de Castellane

Upon his graduation from the Französisches Gymnasium Berlin in 1852, Antoni joined the military firstly as part of the Guards Artillery Regiment, before serving an 8-month internship with the 3rd Artillery Regiment in Magdeburg.

During that time he accompanied Prince Frederick William to Moscow to witness the coronation of Tsar Alexander II of Russia in August 1856. Between 1858 and 1861 he enrolled in the military academy, rising to the rank of captain.

In 1866 Prince Radziwiłł participated in the Austro-Prussian War as part of the General Staff of Prince August of Württemberg's Guard Corps, after which he was appointed personal aide-de-camp to King William I. He became a close confidant of the king, often accompanying him on important events.

He would play a major role in the future Franco-Prussian War, as he was the one to deliver the Ems Dispatch to Count Benedetti, as well as announcing the ceasefire after the Battle of Sedan on 2 September 1870 and witnessing the proclamation of the German Empire at Versailles.

In 1885, William I appointed him to the rank of Adjutant general.

=== Later life ===
From 1871 to 1888, Prince Radziwiłł was a member of the House of Lords in the Kingdom of Prussia. He and his wife ran a popular salon in Berlin, where they entertained many Polish politicians and members of the Catholic Center Party.

This earned him the distrust of Chancellor Otto von Bismarck during the Kulturkampf, which was exacerbated by the fact that Antoni's cousin Ferdynand Radziwiłł was a member of the Polish Party.

He was promoted to General of the Infantry by Emperor Frederick III, upon the latter's accession to the throne, while retaining his position as Adjutant.

Upon Frederick's death in 1888, however, he was dismissed by the next Emperor, William II, who on 22 March 1889 granted him the "duty title" of General of the Artillery.

== Personal life ==
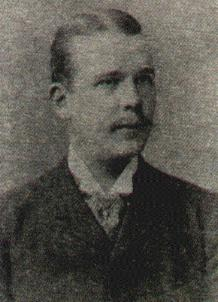
Radziwiłł's eldest son, Prince Jerzy

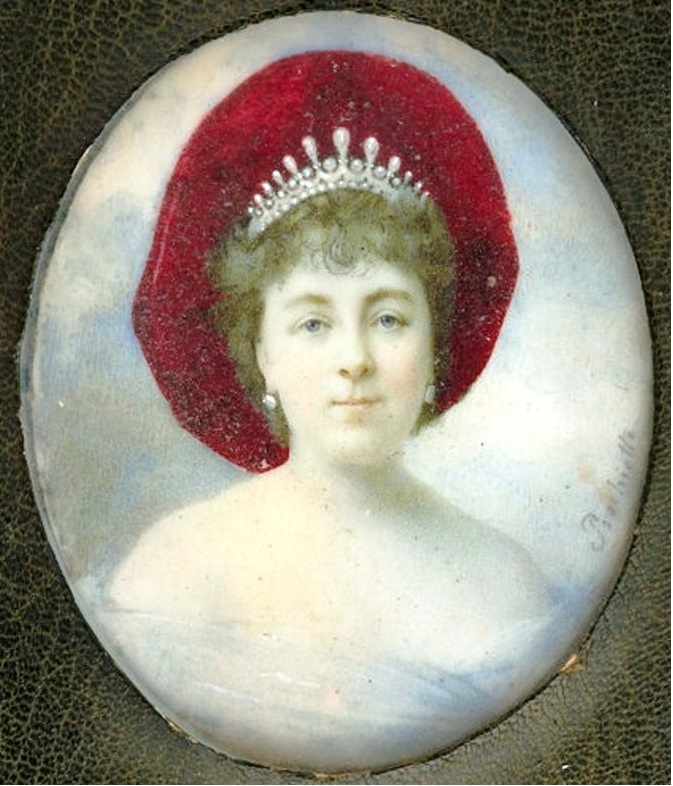
Prince Jerzy's wife, Maria Róża Branicki

On 3 October 1857, Radziwiłł married Marie de Castellane, the daughter of French aristocrats Henri de Castellane and his wife, Pauline de Talleyrand-Périgord, in Sagan.

They had four children, two sons and two daughters:

- Prince Jerzy Fryderyk Radziwiłł (1860–1914), who married Maria Róża Branicki (1863–1941), daughter of Władysław Michał Branicki, owner of a large estate in Biała Cerkiew.
- Princess Elżbieta Matylda Radziwiłł (1861–1950), who married Count Roman Potocki, a son of Count Alfred Józef Potocki, Minister-President of Austria, and Princess Maria Klementyna Sanguszko.
- Princess Helena Augusta Radziwiłł (1874–1958), who married Count Józef Mikołaj Potocki, another son of Count Alfred Józef Potocki. Helena and Józef were the parents of Józef Alfred Potocki.
- Prince Stanisław Wilhelm Radziwiłł (1880–1920), who married Princess Dolores Radziwiłł, a daughter of Prince Dominic Maria Radziwiłł and sister of Prince Hieronim Mikołaj Radziwiłł (who married Archduchess Renata of Austria).

Radziwiłł died in Berlin in 1904; his funeral was held at St. Hedwig's Cathedral, and attended by the Kaiser himself. His remains were interred at the family crypt in Nyasvizh in 1905. His widow died at the Kleinitz Palace in Lower Silesia in July 1915.

=== Descendants ===
Through his eldest son, he was a grandfather of Prince Albrecht Radziwiłł (1885–1935), who married American heiress Dorothy Evelyn Deacon, daughter of Edward Parker Deacon, in 1910. They divorced and she married Count Paul Pálffy ab Erdöd.

Through his daughter Elżbieta, he was a grandfather of Count Alfred Antoni Potocki (1886–1958) and Count Jerzy Antoni Potocki (1889–1961), the Polish ambassador to the United States from 1936 to 1940.

== Honours ==
=== Decorations and awards ===
German honours

- Prussia:
  - War Commemorative Cross (1866)
  - Knight of the Crown Order, 3rd Class with Swords, 20 September 1866; 1st Class with Swords on Ring, 22 March 1883
  - Knight's Cross of the Royal House Order of Hohenzollern, 19 January 1868; with Swords, 1871
  - Iron Cross (1870), 2nd Class on Black Band
  - Knight of the Red Eagle, 2nd Class with Oak Leaves, 22 March 1874; with Star, 2 November 1881; Grand Cross, 20 September 1890
  - Service Award Cross
  - Knight of the Black Eagle, 22 March 1894; with Collar
- Hohenzollern: Cross of Honour of the Princely House Order of Hohenzollern, 1st Class with Swords
- (Duchy of Anhalt) Anhalt: Commander of the Order of Albert the Bear, 1st Class, 1876
- Baden: Commander of the Zähringer Lion, 1st Class with Swords, 1875; Grand Cross, 1881
- Bavaria:
  - Knight of St. Hubert, 1871
  - Commander of the Military Merit Order
- (Saxe-Coburg and Gotha) (Duchy of Saxe-Altenburg) (Saxe-Meiningen) Ernestine duchies: Grand Cross of the Saxe-Ernestine House Order, 1878
- Hesse and by Rhine:
  - Commander of the Merit Order of Philip the Magnanimous, 1st Class with Swords, 25 September 1877
  - Commander of the Ludwig Order, 2nd Class
- Lippe:
  - Cross of Honour of the House Order of Lippe, 1st Class
  - Military Merit Medal (Schaumburg-Lippe)
- Mecklenburg:
  - Grand Cross of the Wendish Crown, with Crown in Ore
  - Military Merit Cross, 2nd Class (Schwerin)
- Oldenburg: Commander of the Order of Duke Peter Friedrich Ludwig, with Swords, 22 March 1871; Grand Cross with Swords on Ring, 18 February 1878
- Saxe-Weimar-Eisenach: Commander of the White Falcon, 10 October 1867; Grand Cross, 1887
- Saxony: Grand Cross of the Albert Order, 1877
- Württemberg:
  - Commander of the Württemberg Crown, with Swords, 1870; Grand Cross, 1885
  - Grand Cross of the Friedrich Order, 1876

Foreign honours

- (Austrian Empire) (Kingdom of Hungary) Austria-Hungary:
  - Commander of the Imperial Order of Leopold, 1871
  - Commander of the Order of Franz Joseph, 1872
  - Knight of the Iron Crown, 1st Class, 1884
- France: Officer of the Legion of Honour
- Italy:
  - Grand Officer of Saints Maurice and Lazarus
  - Grand Officer of the Crown of Italy
- Ottoman Empire: Order of Osmanieh, 1st Class
- Portugal: Grand Cross of the Royal Military Order of St. Benedict of Aviz
- Romania: Grand Cross of the Star of Romania
- Russian Empire:
  - Knight of the White Eagle
  - Knight of St. Anna, 2nd Class in Diamonds
  - Knight of St. Vladimir, 3rd Class with Swords
- Spain: Grand Cross of the Order of Charles III, 2 April 1888
- Sweden-Norway: Commander of the Sword, 1st Class, 2 June 1875; Commander Grand Cross, 1889

=== Military appointments ===
- À la suite of the 1st Guards Field Artillery Regiment

== Bibliography ==
- Ryszard Dzieszyński, Sedan tysiąc osiemset siedemdziesiąt, Bellona 2009, p. 18.
- Petra Wilhelmy-Dollinger, The Berlin salons. Berlin 2000. p. 251
