= Antoni Radziwiłł =

Polish and Prussian noble (1775–1833)

Antoni Henryk Radziwiłł
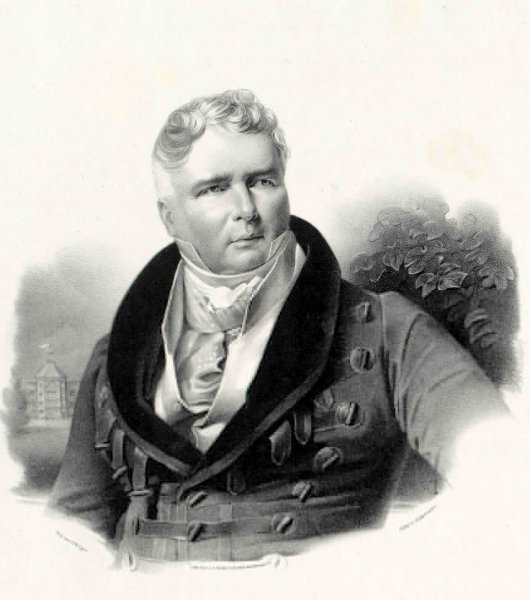
- Engraving by Franz Krüger, c. 1830

Duke-Governor of the Grand Duchy of Posen
- In office 1815–1830
- Preceded by: new creation
- Succeeded by: Eduard Heinrich von Flottwell (as Oberpräsident)

Personal details
- Born: 13 June 1775 Vilnius, Grand Duchy of Lithuania, Polish–Lithuanian Commonwealth
- Died: 7 April 1833 (aged 57) Berlin, Kingdom of Prussia
- Resting place: Poznań Cathedral
- Spouse: Princess Louise of Prussia (m. 1796; died 1833)
- Children: Wilhelm Paweł; Ferdynand Fryderyk; Ludwika; Fryderyka Helena; Eliza Fryderyka; Bogusław Fryderyk; Władysław; Wanda Augusta Wilhelmina
- Parent(s): Michał Hieronim Radziwiłł; Helena Przeździecka

Prince Antoni Henryk Radziwiłł (Polish pronunciation: [anˈtɔɲi ˈxɛnrɨk raˈd͡ʑiviww]; 13 June 1775 – 7 April 1833) was a Polish–Lithuanian and Prussian noble, aristocrat, musician, and politician. Initially a hereditary Duke of Nieśwież and Ołyka, as a scion of the Radziwiłł family he also held the honorific title of a Reichsfürst of the Holy Roman Empire. Between 1815 and 1831 he acted as Duke-Governor (Polish: książę-namiestnik, German: Statthalter) of the Grand Duchy of Posen, an autonomous province of the Kingdom of Prussia created out of Greater Polish lands annexed in the Partitions of Poland.

== Early life ==
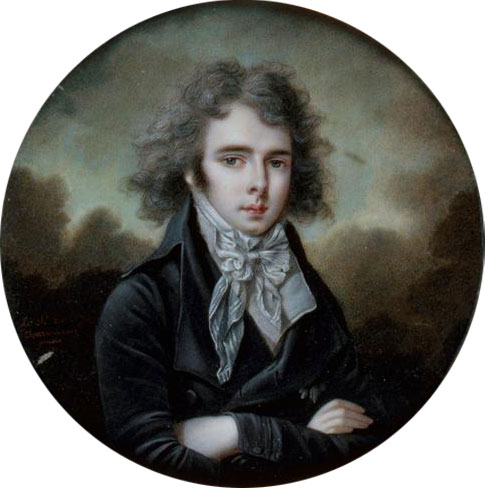
Contemporary portrait, 1797

Antoni Radziwiłł was born on 13 June 1775 in Vilnius to Michał Hieronim Radziwiłł and Helena née Przeździecka. He studied at the University of Göttingen, like his other brothers: the elder Ludwik Mikołaj and the younger Michał Gedeon and Andrzej Walenty. One of his sisters was Aniela Radziwiłł (who married Prince Konstanty Adam Czartoryski).

His father was the second son of Prince Marcin Mikołaj Radziwiłł and, his second wife, Marta Trembicka. His maternal grandparents were Antoni Przeździecki and Katarzyna Ogińska. After his maternal grandmother's death, his mother was raised by her aunt, Aleksandra Czartoryska, the wife of Michał Kazimierz Ogiński.

The high standing of the Radziwiłł family in Poland–Lithuania resulted in an offer from the royal Hohenzollern court to arrange a marriage between Frederica Louise, daughter of August Ferdinand, the brother of King Frederick William II, and the young Antoni Henryk. The backdrop to this marriage was the Kościuszko Uprising and the fall of Poland as a result of the Third Partition. The marriage took place only after the collapse of Poland.

== Career ==
The Trąby ("Horns") coat-of-arms of the Radziwiłłs, as Princes of the Holy Roman Empire, appears in the center of a Black Eagle within a Golden Shield.

Following his 1796 marriage to Princess Louise of Prussia, his new family convinced him that he should be a mediator between the Poles living under the Third Partition after the failed Kościuszko Uprising and the Prussian authorities in Berlin. Fluctuating between Berlin, Warsaw and Saint Petersburg, Radziwiłł developed the idea of making the province of South Prussia the nucleus of a renewed Polish kingdom, ruled by the Prussian king in personal union.

During Napoleon's 1806 campaign in Poland during the War of the Fourth Coalition, he tried to incite a Polish uprising against the French army and to convince Prince Józef Poniatowski to abandon his French allies and join the cause of the Russian Empire and Prussia. He failed on both occasions, when Prussia suffered a crushing defeat at the Battle of Jena-Auerstedt. Instead, Napoleon's expedition sparked the Greater Poland Uprising, which led to the establishment of the Duchy of Warsaw under the rule of King Frederick Augustus I of Saxony with Prince Poniatowski as War Minister. In the following years, Radziwiłł retired to his city palace in Berlin and concentrated on regaining his family's vast estates in the Russian partition from the hands of Emperor Alexander I of Russia.

=== Duke-Governor ===
Upon the Final Act of the 1815 Congress of Vienna, he was sent to the Greater-Poland capital Poznań as Duke-Governor and representative of Prussian King Frederick William III in the Grand Duchy of Posen. Struggling between his Polish subjects and the Prussian authorities, Radziwiłł found himself with little power, as effective power was executed by Oberpräsident Joseph Zerboni di Sposetti and the district governors heading the Regierungsbezirke of Posen and Bromberg. His daughter Elisa's engagement to Prussian Prince (later German Emperor) William I was broken in 1824.

Shortly after the outbreak of the 1830 November Uprising in Russian Congress Poland led by his brother Michał Gedeon Radziwiłł, he was deprived of all powers, and the rule passed to Oberpräsident Eduard Heinrich von Flottwell. Next year the office of Duke-Governor was abolished, and the autonomy of the Grand Duchy was cancelled. It was incorporated into the Provinces of Prussia, renamed the "Province of Posen" in 1848.

== Personal life ==
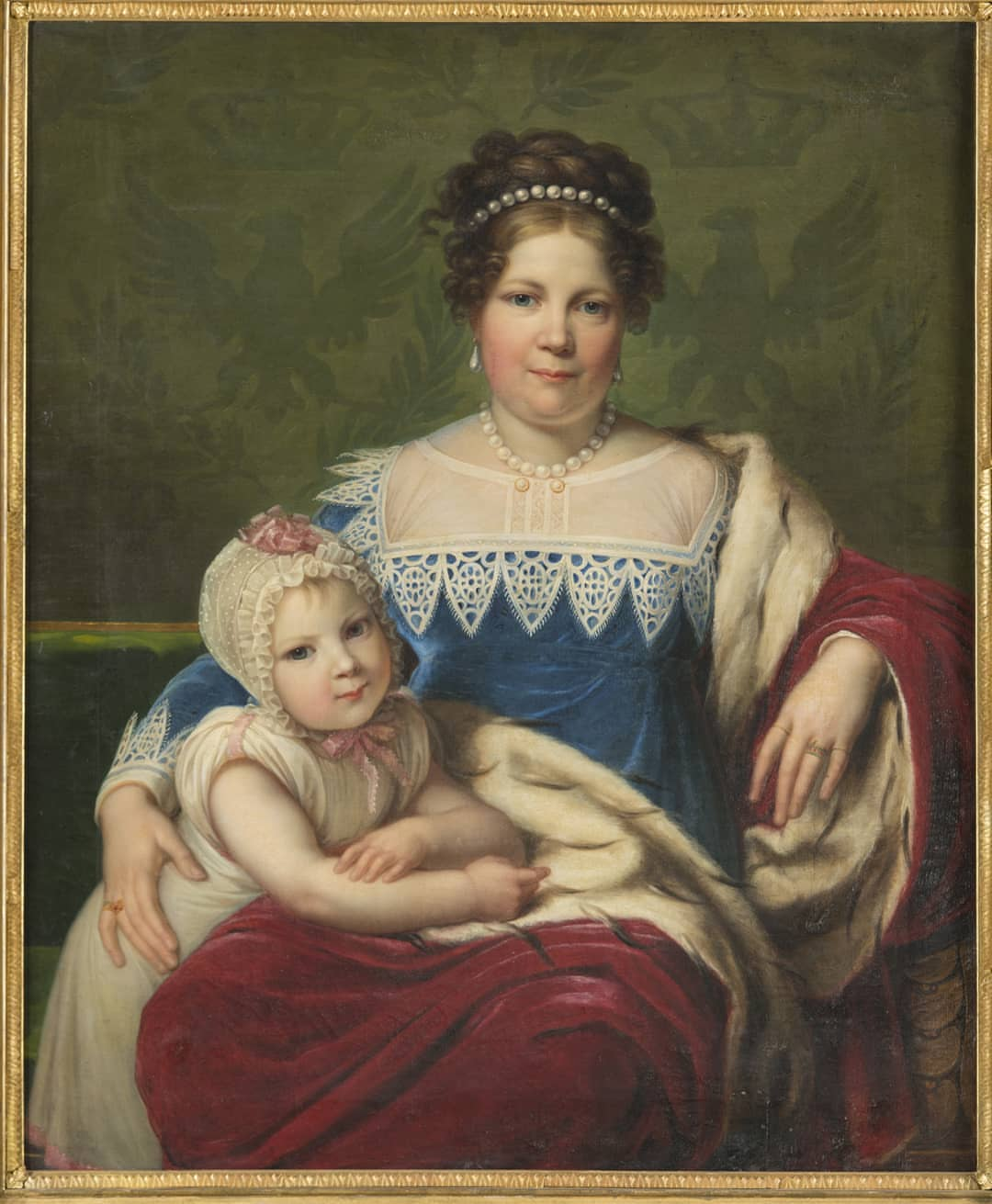
Portrait of his wife, Princess Louise, and his youngest daughter, Princess Wanda, 1815.

In 1796 he married Princess Louise of Prussia (1770–1836), the second daughter of Margravine Elisabeth Louise of Brandenburg-Schwedt and Prince Augustus Ferdinand of Prussia and hence a niece of the late Prussian king Frederick the Great. Together, they were the parents of:

- Prince Wilhelm Paweł Radziwiłł (1797–1870), who married his first cousin, Princess Helena Radziwill, a daughter of Ludwig Nikolai Radziwill and Marianna Wodzinska, in 1825. After her death in 1827, he married Countess Mathilde von Clary und Aldringen, a daughter of Carl Joseph, 3rd Prince of Clary-Aldringen, in 1832.
- Prince Ferdynand Fryderyk Radziwiłł (1798–1827), who died, unmarried, at Ruhberg.
- Princess Ludwika Radziwiłł (1799–1808), who died young.
- Princess Fryderyka Helena Radziwiłł (1802–1803), who died young.
- Princess Eliza Fryderyka Radziwiłł (1803–1834), the desired bride of Prince William of Prussia, who later became William I, German Emperor, but they were not allowed to marry.
- Prince Bogusław Fryderyk Radziwiłł (1809–1873), who married Countess Leontyna von Clary und Aldringen, in 1832.
- Prince Władysław Radziwiłł (1811–1831), who died unmarried.
- Princess Wanda Augusta Wilhelmina Radziwiłł (1813–1845), who married her first cousin, Prince Adam Czartoryski, son of Prince Konstanty Adam Czartoryski and Princess Angelika Radziwiłł, in 1832.

Radziwiłł returned to his palace in Berlin, where he died on 7 April 1833. He was buried in the Poznań Cathedral. His children with Louise were Germanized and never returned to Poznań; however, as owners of the Nieborów manor near Warsaw and huge family estates in today's Belarus, they paid frequent visits to other parts of Poland.

=== Patron of the arts ===
Chopin plays piano in Radziwiłł's Berlin salon at Palais Radziwill (Henryk Siemiradzki, 1887);

Antoni Radziwiłł is better known for his art patronage than for his ill-fated political career. His palaces in Berlin (the later Reich Chancellery of Otto von Bismarck), Poznań and Antonin near Ostrów Wielkopolski were known for great concerts performed by one of the most notable musicians of his times. Apart from the guitar, cello and opera concerts performed by Radziwiłł himself, among his guests were Niccolò Paganini (concert in Poznań on 19 May 1829), Johann Wolfgang von Goethe, Frédéric Chopin and Ludwig van Beethoven. Chopin wrote his Introduction and Polonaise Op. 3 for cello and piano especially for Radziwiłł. He also performed a concert in his palace in Poznań on 2 October 1828. Additionally, Chopin dedicated his Piano Trio Op. 8 to Radziwiłł. Ludwig van Beethoven dedicated his Ouverture Op. 115 (Zur Namensfeier) to him, while Goethe participated in his efforts to write the music for his Faust. Maria Agata Szymanowska dedicated to him the Serenade pour le Pianoforte avec le accompagnement de violoncelle. He was also a notable sponsor of Polish theatres and his wife opened the first public school for girls in Poznań in 1830.

== Awards ==
- Polish-Lithuanian Commonwealth: Knight of the Order of the White Eagle, 6 September 1793; 1 December 1815
- Kingdom of Prussia:
  - Knight of the Order of the Red Eagle, 1795
  - Knight of the Order of the Black Eagle, 16 March 1796
- Kingdom of Bavaria: Knight of the Order of Saint Hubert, 1825
- Sovereign Military Order of Malta: Knight of Honour and Devotion

== See also ==
- Trąby coat of arms
- Radziwiłł
