= Henryk Ittar =

Polish Neoclassical architect born in Sicily (1773–1835)

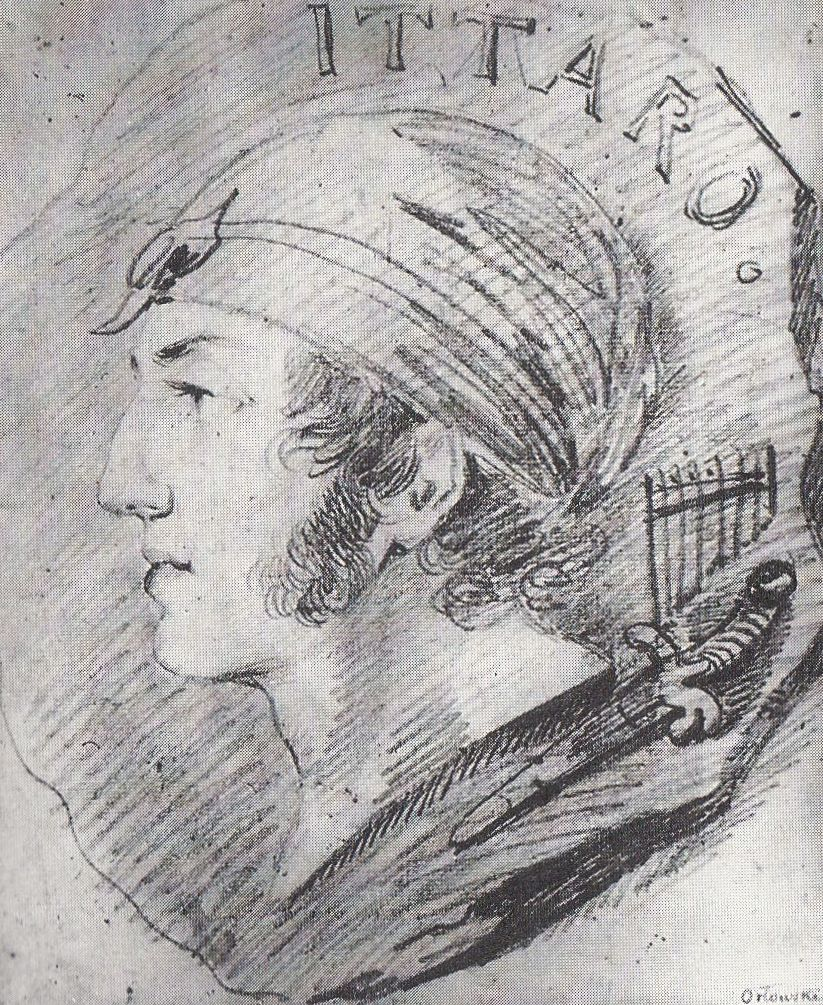
- Ittar drawn by Aleksander Orłowski, c. 1800
- Born: Enrico Giacinto Salvatore Ittar; 1773; Catania, Kingdom of Sicily
- Died: 20 June 1835 (Note: Reference works disagree on the date and place of death. Encyklopedia PWN gives "about 1850" at Trościaniec in Volhynia, Krzysztof Jabłoński "before 1850", and the Oxford Dictionary of Architecture 1850. The local encyclopedia Zamościopedia gives 1837 and says that he died in Dubno. The date given here comes from the death register of the Roman Catholic parish of Dubno, which records the death in the town on 20 June 1835 of Henryk Ittar, aged 63, widower of Marianna née Berghan, who left three daughters, Rozalia, Teresa and Teofila.); Dubno, Volhynian Governorate, Russian Empire
- Occupation: Architect
- Spouse: Marianna Berghan
- Parent(s): Stefano Ittar; Rosalia Battaglia
- Buildings: Circus (1801) and Amphitheatre (1804), Arkadia; Zamoyski Palace, Zamość (rebuilt 1803–1807); Palace at Szpanów (rebuilt 1815–1830)
- Projects: Theatre for Poznań (1797, unbuilt)

Henryk Ittar (born Enrico Giacinto Salvatore Ittar; 1773 – 20 June 1835) was a Neoclassical architect, born in Sicily to a family from Volhynia, who worked in Poland and then in Volhynia and Podolia. For Helena Radziwiłł he built the Circus, the Amphitheatre and the Tomb of Illusions in her landscape garden at Arkadia. He went on to rebuild the Zamoyski Palace in Zamość, worked at Klemensów and Łańcut, and after 1815 designed palaces and Gothic Revival buildings for landowners in Volhynia and Podolia, settling at Dubno.

== Early life and training ==
Ittar was born in Catania in 1773. His father, the architect Stefano Ittar, came from Ovruch in Volhynia and had settled in Catania in 1765. In 1767 Stefano married Rosalia, daughter of the Catanese architect Francesco Battaglia. The couple had nine children. Two sons, Sebastiano Ittar and Enrico (Henryk), became architects, and a third, Benedetto (Benedykt), a painter and engraver. In 1784 Stefano moved the family to Valletta, where he designed the library of the Order of St John; he died there on 18 January 1790.

Henryk trained in Rome. Jabłoński thinks he probably studied at the French Academy in Rome; Francesca Buscemi records only that he finished his training in Rome and then joined the branch of the family that had stayed in Poland, while his brothers Benedetto and Sebastiano moved to Rome and another brother, Giovanni, went to Crete. He reached Poland in the 1790s. (Note: Encyklopedia PWN says he was in Poland from 1790, Jabłoński "after 1790", and Zamościopedia gives 1799.)

== Career ==
=== Poznań and Arkadia ===
In 1797 Ittar designed a theatre for Poznań. It was never built; Jabłoński attributes this to the novelty of the design.

At Arkadia, the garden that Helena Radziwiłł had begun near Nieborów in 1778, Jan Piotr Norblin and Aleksander Orłowski sketched the architectural ideas, which Szymon Bogumił Zug carried out until 1797 and Ittar after him. Jabłoński dates his work for her from 1799. Around 1800 Radziwiłł turned to the Romantic garden and extended Arkadia into the fields beyond the Skierniewka stream. There Ittar built the Tomb of Illusions on the "Elysian Fields" (1800), a Roman-style Circus and an Amphitheatre (1804). The museum dates the Circus to 1801 on its own page for the building and to 1803 on its general history of the garden; the Oxford Dictionary of Architecture gives 1801 for the Circus and about 1805 for the Amphitheatre. James Stevens Curl connects both buildings with Piranesi's engravings, suggests that the Circus alluded to the imperial palace on the Palatine Hill, and calls it unprecedented in European gardens. Radziwiłł also bought from Ittar an antique sarcophagus and a modern statue of Calliope for her collection.

Curl also credits Ittar with the tomb on the Isle of Poplars, which stands on the axis of the Circus. The museum dates that tomb to 1785–1789, under Zug.

Of the Circus only the central obelisk, inscribed MUNIFICENTIAE AUGUSTI HELENA POSUIT, and the two cylindrical metae survive. Zygmunt Radziwiłł, who owned Nieborów after 1864, had Ittar's other buildings in the garden pulled down.

=== Zamość, Klemensów and Łańcut ===
Ittar held the rank of major of sappers and miners. He came to Zamość to compete for the rebuilding of the palace of the Zamoyski entail. From 1803 to 1807 he directed its reconstruction to his own design. From 1805 he taught drawing and practical architecture at the Royal Lyceum in Zamość, and in 1808 he designed a monument to the army of the Duchy of Warsaw, which was never erected; the drawing is in the National Museum in Warsaw. His brother Benedykt, who came to Zamość with him, taught drawing at the provincial school there.

He also rebuilt the Zamoyski palace at Klemensów and added several Gothic Revival buildings there. The Guide to Architecture in Poland credits him with the Neoclassical orangery there (1810–1813), which Henryk Marconi rebuilt in 1826–1841. Encyklopedia PWN adds work on the castle at Łańcut in 1807–1808.

=== Volhynia and Podolia ===
After 1814 Ittar moved to Volhynia. In 1815–1830 he rebuilt the palace at Szpanów, near Równe, for Aleksandra Radziwiłł, née Stecka, who had brought the estate as her dowry to Michał Gedeon Radziwiłł in 1815. She engaged Ittar together with the garden designer Dionizy Mikler and made Szpanów one of the finest residences in Volhynia. Jabłoński lists his Gothic Revival works of these years: the rebuilding of the church at Międzybóż, a park pavilion at Tulczyn and a drawbridge at Warkowicze. Encyklopedia PWN dates the Międzybóż church to 1823 and also credits him with palaces in Dubno, Podłużne and Sierniki. The Geographical Dictionary of the Kingdom of Poland describes the small palace and Gothic chapel at Zaborol, near Łuck, as built "to the plan of Itar, the famous architect from Dubno".

== Death ==
According to the death register of the Roman Catholic parish of Dubno, Henryk Ittar died in the town of consumption on 20 June 1835, aged 63, and was buried on 22 June in the parish cemetery outside the town. Zamościopedia also places his death in Dubno. Most reference works give a later date of about 1850.

== Family ==
Ittar married Marianna (Maria) Berghan, who died before him. Their three daughters, Rozalia, Teresa and Teofila, survived him. He left them about 30 morgs of land in Zamość. On 15 June 1837 Teofila married Sergiusz Aleksander Ittar, the son of Benedykt Ittar and Magdalena Sicotti, at Dubno, under a papal dispensation for consanguinity in the second degree; both bride and groom lived at Załuże in the parish of Dubno. In 1843 the Orthodox parish registers of Płoska, south of Dubno, name the owner of Płoska and of the neighbouring village of Pererośla as the landowner Venedikt (Benedykt) Ittar.

== Legacy ==
Curl ranks some of Ittar's designs for Arkadia among the most advanced severe conceptions of their time. Jabłoński notes that Ittar is known mostly from surviving drawings and a small number of executed buildings, and places him among architects whose independent vision broke with the classical canon of the period. The obelisk and metae of the Circus remain in the garden at Arkadia, which the National Museum in Warsaw administers together with Nieborów Palace.

== Works ==
- Theatre for Poznań, design (1797), unbuilt
- Arkadia: Tomb of Illusions (1800), Circus (1801), Amphitheatre (1804); only parts of the Circus survive
- Rebuilding of the Zamoyski Palace, Zamość (1803–1807)
- Monument to the army of the Duchy of Warsaw, design (1808), unbuilt
- Castle at Łańcut, alterations (1807–1808)
- Klemensów: rebuilding of the palace, orangery (1810–1813) and Gothic Revival buildings
- Palace at Szpanów, rebuilding (1815–1830)
- Church at Międzybóż, Gothic Revival rebuilding (1823)
- Park pavilion at Tulczyn; drawbridge at Warkowicze
- Small palace and Gothic chapel at Zaborol
- Palaces at Dubno, Podłużne and Sierniki
