= Michałówek =

Michałówek may refer to the following places:

- Michałówek, Łowicz County in Łódź Voivodeship (central Poland)
- Michałówek, Zgierz County in Łódź Voivodeship (central Poland)
- Michałówek, Otwock County in Masovian Voivodeship (east-central Poland)
- Michałówek, Płońsk County in Masovian Voivodeship (east-central Poland)
- Michałówek, Warsaw West County in Masovian Voivodeship (east-central Poland)
- Michałówek, Opole Voivodeship (south-west Poland)
