= Julianów =

Julianów may refer to:

- Julianów, Kutno County in Łódź Voivodeship (central Poland)
- Julianów, Łowicz County in Łódź Voivodeship (central Poland)
- Julianów, Chełm County in Lublin Voivodeship (east Poland)
- Julianów, Opoczno County in Łódź Voivodeship (central Poland)
- Julianów, Rawa County in Łódź Voivodeship (central Poland)
- Julianów, Gmina Żelechlinek, Tomaszów County in Łódź Voivodeship (central Poland)
- Julianów, Ryki County in Lublin Voivodeship (east Poland)
- Julianów, Kielce County in Świętokrzyskie Voivodeship (south-central Poland)
- Julianów, Końskie County in Świętokrzyskie Voivodeship (south-central Poland)
- Julianów, Gmina Ożarów in Świętokrzyskie Voivodeship (south-central Poland)
- Julianów, Gmina Tarłów in Świętokrzyskie Voivodeship (south-central Poland)
- Julianów, Gmina Belsk Duży in Masovian Voivodeship (east-central Poland)
- Julianów, Gmina Błędów in Masovian Voivodeship (east-central Poland)
- Julianów, Mińsk County in Masovian Voivodeship (east-central Poland)
- Julianów, Gmina Piaseczno in Masovian Voivodeship (east-central Poland)
- Julianów, Gmina Góra Kalwaria in Masovian Voivodeship (east-central Poland)
- Julianów, Gmina Tarczyn in Masovian Voivodeship (east-central Poland)
- Julianów, Zwoleń County in Masovian Voivodeship (east-central Poland)
- Julianów, Silesian Voivodeship (south Poland)
