= Elisa Radziwiłł =

Polish noblewoman (1803–1834)

Princess Elisa Radziwiłł
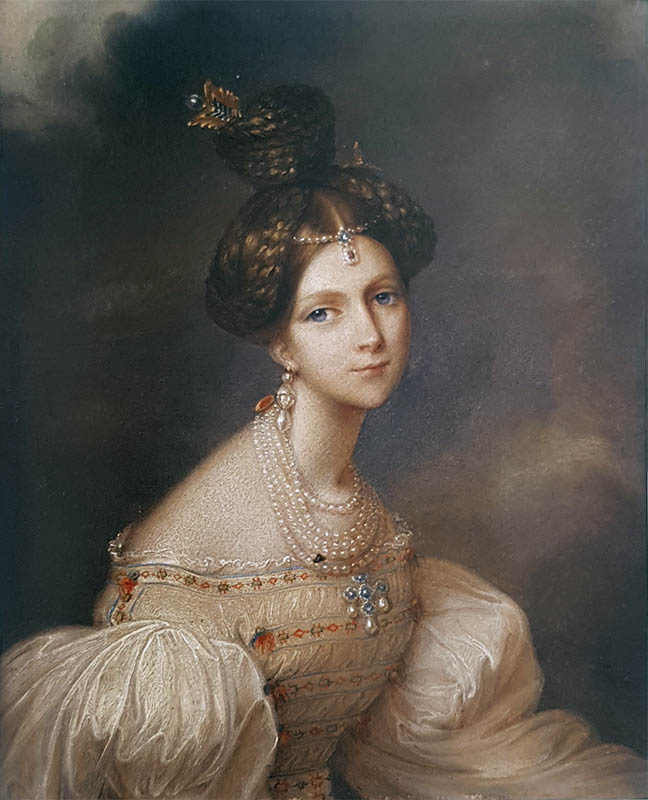
- Born: 28 October 1803; Berlin
- Died: 27 August 1834 (aged 30); Bad Freienwalde
Names
- Elisa Friederike Luise Martha Radziwiłł
- House: Radziwiłł
- Father: Prince Antoni Radziwiłł
- Mother: Princess Louise of Prussia

Princess Elisa Radziwiłł (Elisa Friederike Luise Martha; Polish: Eliza Fryderyka Luiza Marta Radziwiłłówna; 28 October 1803 – 27 August 1834) was a member of Polish–Lithuanian nobility (of the House of Radziwiłł, who were elite magnates), of royal ancestry. She was the desired bride of Prince William of Prussia, who later became William I, German Emperor, but they were not allowed to marry.

== Life ==
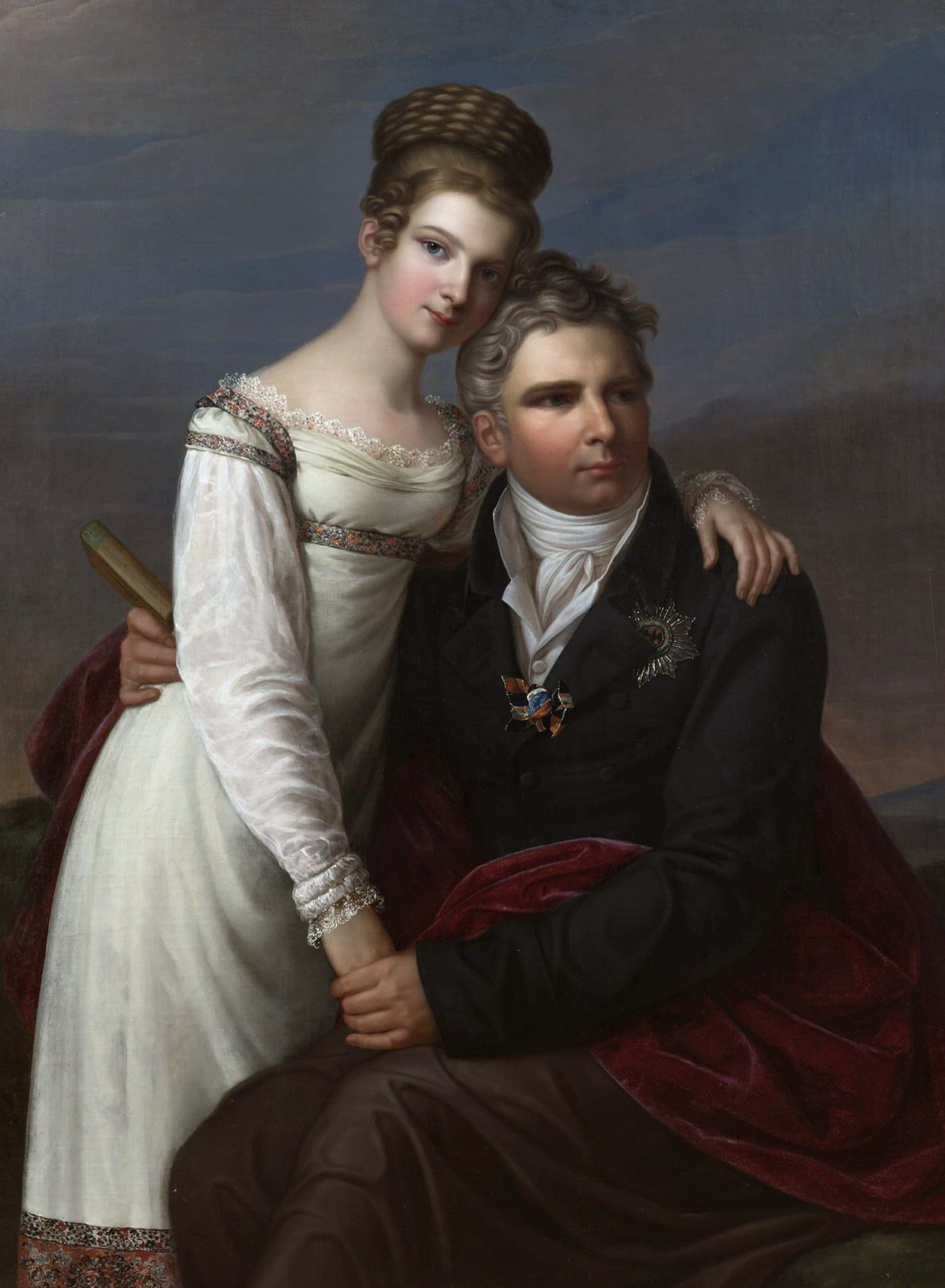
Elisa with her father, 1820.

Elisa, the daughter of Prince Antoni Radziwiłł and his wife, Princess Louise of Prussia, niece of King Frederick the Great, was born in Berlin. Prince William, her second cousin once removed and the second son of the King Frederick William III, was her childhood friend, and over time they fell in love.

The childlessness of William’s elder brother, however, meant that a possible accession to the throne made their relationship complicated due to the inequality of rank, as the Radziwiłłs were not a royal family. The couple was separated for three years. In this situation, the Russian emperor Alexander I offered to adopt Eliza, but the proposal was withdrawn because of a precedent at the Russian court, when Grand Duke Constantine, after marrying Joanna Grudzińska, renounced his rights to the throne. The Radziwiłł family presented legal opinions and evidence demonstrating the high status of their house and its connections with the Hohenzollerns. Above all, they emphasized the fact that Barbara Radziwiłł had been Queen of Poland, that Janusz Radziwiłł married Elisabeth Sophia of Brandenburg, and that their granddaughter Ludwika Karolina married Ludwig Leopold, son of the Great Elector.

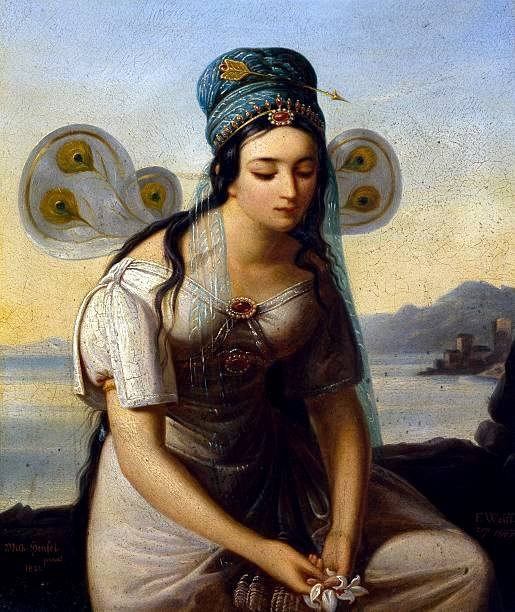
Elisa dressed as the Goddess Peri, inspired by the oratorio Paradise and the Peri, by Robert Schumann (1810-1856).

Thus in 1824, the King of Prussia turned to the childless Emperor Alexander I of Russia to adopt Radziwiłł, but the Russian ruler declined. The second adoption plan by Radziwiłł's uncle, Prince Augustus of Prussia, likewise failed as the responsible committee considered that adoption "does not alter the blood" (a principle which governs noble and royal connections to the present day). Another factor was the influence of the Mecklenburg kinsmen of the deceased Queen Louise in the German and Russian courts who were not fond of Radziwiłł's father and opposed the possible marriage.

Eventually, in June 1826, William's father was obliged to demand the renunciation of a potential marriage to Radziwiłł. William spent the next few months looking for a more suitable bride, but did not relinquish his emotional ties to Radziwiłł. Eventually, William asked for the hand of Augusta of Saxe-Weimar, fourteen years his junior, in marriage on 29 August 1826 (in writing and through the intervention of his father). William saw his cousin Elisa for the last time in 1829.

Radziwiłł was later engaged to Prince Friedrich von Schwarzenberg, member of the illustrious House of Schwarzenberg, but the engagement failed. She died, unmarried, in Bad Freienwalde in 1834 of tuberculosis while at a spa seeking a cure.

Historian Karin Feuerstein-Prasser has pointed out, on the basis of evaluations of the correspondence between both fiancées, the different expectations Wilhelm had of both marriages: he wrote to his sister, Czarina Alexandra Feodorovna (Charlotte of Prussia), wife of Czar Nicholas I of Russia, regarding Radziwiłł, that "One can love only once in life, really", but confessed regarding Augusta that "the princess is nice and clever, but she leaves me cold." Though Augusta was in love with her future husband and hoped for a happy marriage, theirs was a troubled relationship; Radziwiłł was aware of this, and she believed that she herself would have been a better wife to the Prussian prince.

Teresa Wodzicka, née Potocka, wrote of this relationship: Matters would have proceeded more smoothly had Eliza not been Polish, had there not been the fear that children born of this Polish woman might one day sit on the Prussian throne.

== Ancestry ==
Ancestors of Elisa Radziwiłł

8. Prince Marcin Mikołaj Radziwiłł
4. Michał Hieronim Radziwiłł
9. Marta Trembicka
2. Antoni Radziwiłł
10. Antoni Tadeusz Przeździecki
5. Helena Przeździecka
11. Princess Katarzyna Ogińska
1. Elisa Radziwiłł
12. Frederick William I of Prussia
6. Prince Augustus Ferdinand of Prussia
13. Sophia Dorothea of Hanover
3. Princess Louise of Prussia
14. Frederick William, Margrave of Brandenburg-Schwedt
7. Margravine Louise of Brandenburg-Schwedt
15. Princess Sophia Dorothea of Prussia

== Sources ==
- Durka, Jarosław (2012). Antoni Henryk Radziwiłł (1775-1833) – szkic do portretu arystokraty, namiestnika Wielkiego Księstwa Poznańskiego. Górny Śląsk i Wielkopolska w XIX i pierwszej połowie XX wieku. Wybrane aspekty z dziejów polityki i edukacji. Poznań.
- Fleming, Patrica H. (June 1973). "The Politics of Marriage Among Non-Catholic European Royalty". Current Anthropology. 14 (3): 231–249. doi:10.1086/201323. S2CID 144634148.
