= Mysłaków =

Mysłaków may refer to the following places in Poland:

- Mysłaków, Lower Silesian Voivodeship (south-west Poland)
- Mysłaków, Łódź Voivodeship (central Poland)
