= Karolew =

Karolew may refer to the following places:

- Karolew, Gmina Bedlno in Łódź Voivodeship (central Poland)
- Karolew, Gmina Strzelce in Łódź Voivodeship (central Poland)
- Karolew, Łowicz County in Łódź Voivodeship (central Poland)
- Karolew, Zduńska Wola County in Łódź Voivodeship (central Poland)
- Karolew, Zgierz County in Łódź Voivodeship (central Poland)
- Karolew, Grójec County in Masovian Voivodeship (east-central Poland)
- Karolew, Płock County in Masovian Voivodeship (east-central Poland)
- Karolew, Sokołów County in Masovian Voivodeship (east-central Poland)
- Karolew, Gmina Dąbrówka in Masovian Voivodeship (east-central Poland)
- Karolew, Gmina Klembów in Masovian Voivodeship (east-central Poland)
- Karolew, Greater Poland Voivodeship (west-central Poland)
