= Dubno Castle =

Historic building in Rivne Oblast, Ukraine

Coordinates: 50°25′10″N 25°44′52″E

- Дубенський замок
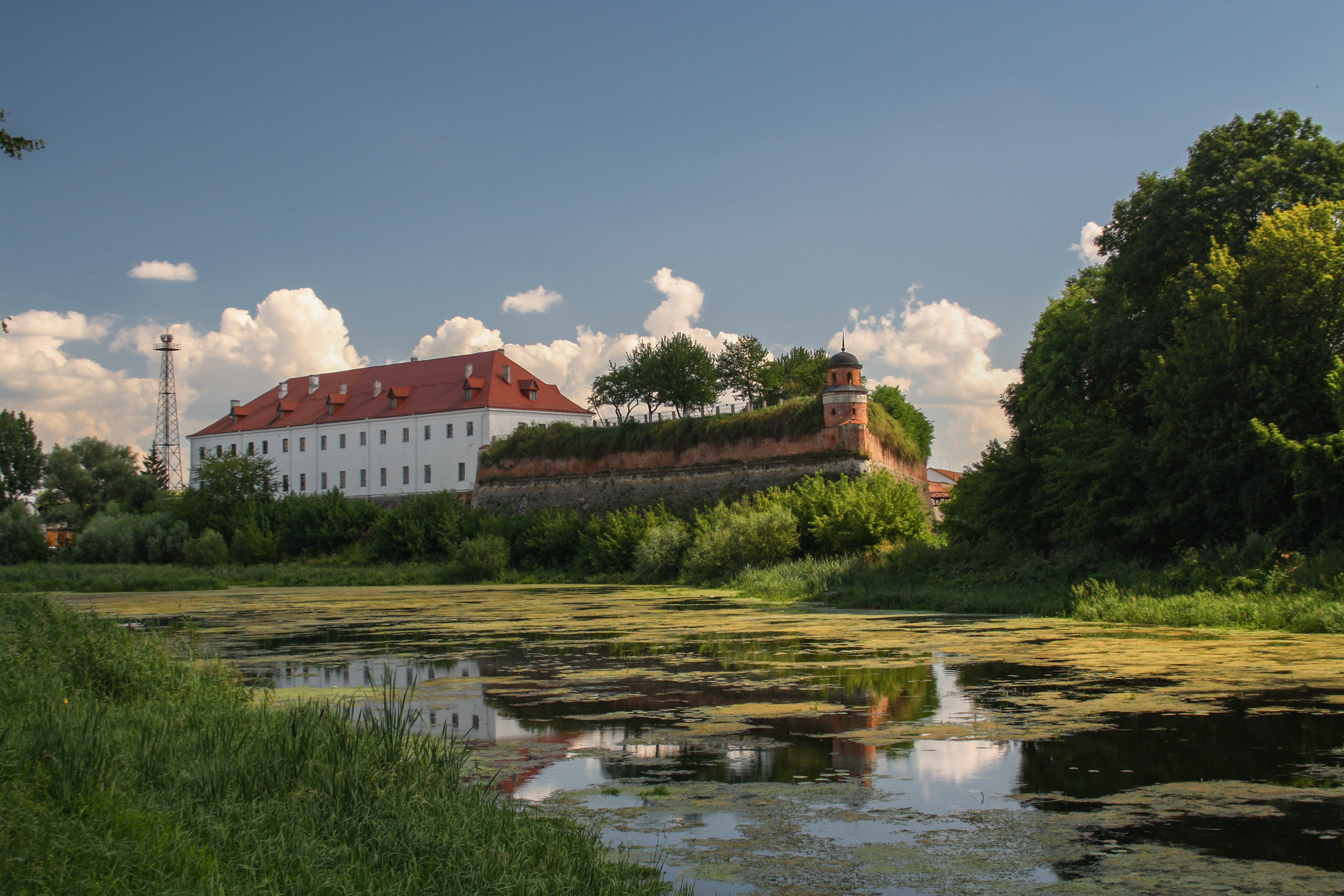
- View from the Ikva River
- Interactive map of the Dubno Castle area

General information
- Construction stopped: 1492
- Renovated: 17th century; 1871

Immovable Monument of National Significance of Ukraine
- Official name: Замок (Castle)
- Type: Architecture
- Reference no.: 170023/1

The Dubno Castle (Ukrainian: Дубенський замок, romanized: Dubens'kyi zamok; Polish: Zamek w Dubnie) was founded in 1492 by Prince Konstantin Ostrogski on a promontory overlooking the Ikva River not far from the ancient Ruthenian fort of Dubno, Volhynia.

Ostrogski castle was rebuilt in stone in the early 16th century under the Lithuanian rule when the city was part of the Grand Duchy of Lithuania. It had a church, a two-story palace, and an impressive array of 73 cannons. It was there that the treasury of the Ostrogski family was kept. These fabulous treasures brought the predatory Crimean Tatars to the castle on several occasions (at least two in 1577 alone).

Prince Janusz Ostrogski, the last of his family, undertook major renovations of the castle in the early 17th century. He made use of the trace itallienne, or "Italian style" of fortification, to transform Dubno into the most advanced fort in the region. Prince Janusz's palace still stands in Dubno.

During the Khmelnytsky Uprising, the vicinity of Dubno Castle was the scene of heavy fighting between the Poles and the Cossacks, some of it described by Nikolai Gogol in the novella Taras Bulba (1835). The castle passed to Polish Prince Władysław Dominik Zasławski as part of the Ostroh inheritance and survived a Russian siege in 1660.

In the 18th century Dubno lost much of its military relevance. Some of the fortifications gave way to a plain rectangular palace of two stories, commissioned in the 1780s by Prince Stanisław Lubomirski from architects Henryk Ittar and Domenico Merlini. The palace's interior layout and design did not survive the First World War.

After the Lubomirskis sold their Dubno residence to Princess Boryatinsky in 1871, the castle was subjected to a new campaign of remodeling. It held a notable military garrison of the Border Defence Corps. The old barbican was transformed in the 1920s into a prison where about 550 political prisoners were executed by the NKVD in 1941.
