= Zygmuntów, Łowicz County =

Zygmuntów
- Village
- Location within Poland
- Coordinates: 52°4′26″N 20°3′11″E
- Country: Poland
- Voivodeship: Łódź
- County: Łowicz
- Gmina: Nieborów

Zygmuntów [zɨɡˈmuntuf] is a village in the administrative district of Gmina Nieborów, within Łowicz County, Łódź Voivodeship, in central Poland.
