= Helena Radziwiłłowa =

Polish aristocrat (1753–1821)

Helena Radziwiłł
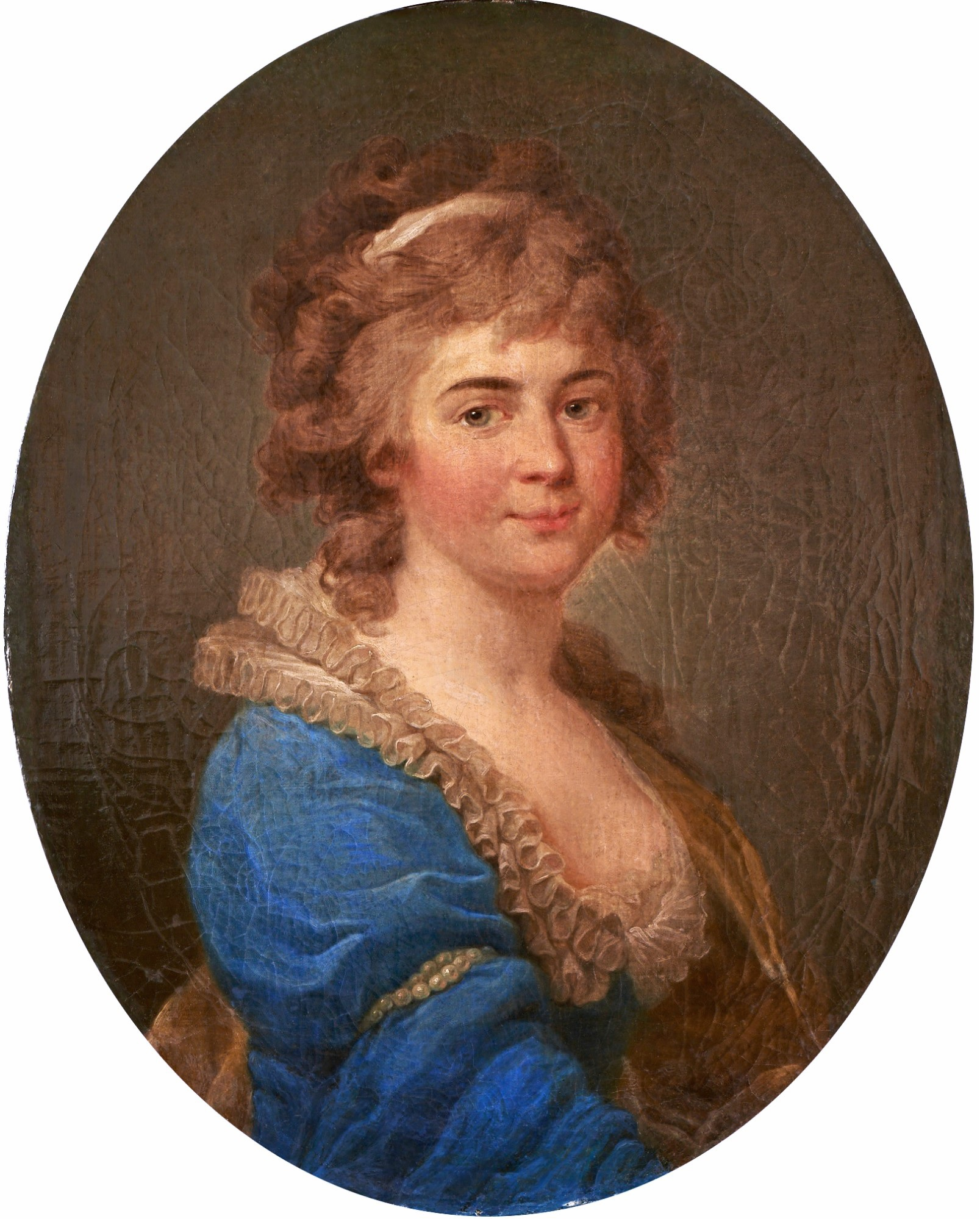
- Portrait by Marcello Bacciarelli, c. 1784
- Born: Helena Przezdecka; 6 January 1753; Vilnius, Polish–Lithuanian Commonwealth
- Died: 1 April 1821 (aged 68); Warsaw, Russian Empire
- Noble family: Przezdecka
- Spouse: Michał Hieronim Radziwiłł
- Issue: Ludwik Mikołaj Radziwiłł; Antoni Henryk Radziwiłł; Krystyna Magdalena Radziwiłł; Michał Gedeon Radziwiłł; Karol Lukasz Radziwiłł; Andrzej Walentyn Radziwiłł; Angelika Radziwiłł; Róża Katarzyna Radziwiłł
- Father: Anthony Tadeusz Pshezdetsky
- Mother: Ekaterina Oginskaya
- Occupation: State Lady

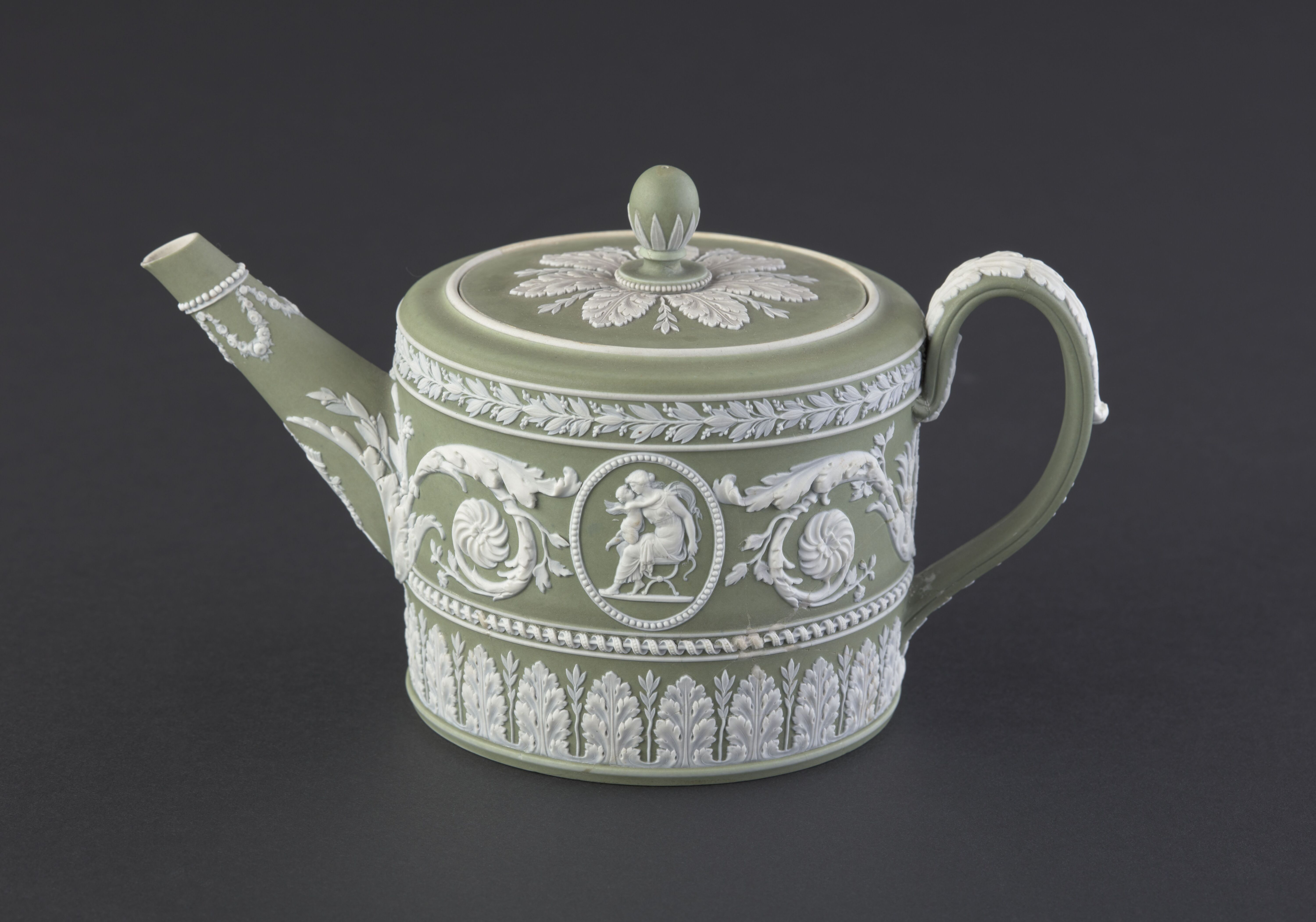
Teapot with lid from the service of Helena Radziwiłłowa. Wedgwood, c. 1788. National Museum in Warsaw

Helena Radziwiłłowa (1753–1821) was a Polish aristocrat.

She was, for a period, a lady-in-waiting to Catherine the Great. She married the Polish magnate and politician Michał Hieronim Radziwiłł in 1771. She was widely known for her love affairs and was the lover of Stanisław August Poniatowski as well as of Otto Magnus von Stackelberg, who benefitted the career of her spouse.

== Biography ==
Helena was born the daughter of Anthony Tadeusz Prezezdecki (1718–1772) and his wife, Princess Catherine Oginska (b. 1725). After the death of her mother, she was raised by her aunt Princess Aleksandra Czartoryska (1730–1798), the wife of Prince Michał Kazimierz Ogiński. She received an education and was fluent in French, English, German, and Italian.

She married Prince Michał Hieronim Radziwiłł (1744–1831) on 26 April 1771. Following the wedding she and her husband lived in Czernawczycy, then Nieborów Palace, and in the Radziwill Palace in Warsaw. At the coronation of Paul I, she was made a lady of state and awarded with the Order of Saint Catherine of the lesser cross.

Following fashion and an example from her rival Izabela Czartoryska, who managed an estate at Puławy, Helena founded her own park not far from Neborov. With the help of architects, she designed the park which she named 'Arcadia" and would devote 40 years of her life to this park.

The park was designed in the English style, its pavilions were decorated with works of art inspired by Ancient Greece and Rome. In July of 1795, Helena Radziwiłł hosted Zofia Potocka, who was inspired to build her own, the famous Sofiyivka Park.

In the later years of her life, Princess Radziwiłł had lost her former cheerfulness. Having met her in 1818, Princess Varvara Turkestanova wrote of her:

"The princess is very kind and accommodating. She has changed and aged a lot. This is attributed to the complete breakdown of her condition: The magnificent Arcadia is about to be confiscated... She is in an extremely difficult situation. The unhappy woman is ruined and mired in debt. In addition, she is responsible for the guardianship of the estate of the late Dominic. She is afriand of the outcome of the trial that she is conducting with the Chernyshevs."

She died in Warsaw in 1821.

== Issue ==
From her marriage with Michał Hieronim Radziwiłł, they had eight children:

- Ludwik Nikolai Radziwiłł (1773–1830), 10th Ordinate of Klecki, married Marianna Wodzinska and had issue.
- Antony Heinrich Radziwiłł (1775-1832), 1st Ordinate in Przygodzica (1796), 12th Ordinate of Niasvizh and 10th Ordinate of Olycki (1814), Prince-Governor of the Grand Duchy of Poznan (1815 -1831). He married Princess Louise of Prussia and had issue.
- Krystyna Magdalena Radziwiłł (1776-1796), maid of honour to Catherine II. During the Empress' funeral, she caught a cold and died of pneumonia.
- Michał Gedeon Radziwiłł (1778-1850), general and senator of Poland. Married Aleksandra Stecka and had issue.
- Andrzej Valent Radziwiłł (1780-1837/8)
- Angelika (Anelja) Radziwiłł (1781-1808) married Prince Konstantin Adam Czartoryski and had issue.
- Rosa Katharina Radziwiłł (1788-1803)
