= Gmina Nieborów =

Gmina Nieborów Nieborów Commune
- Gmina
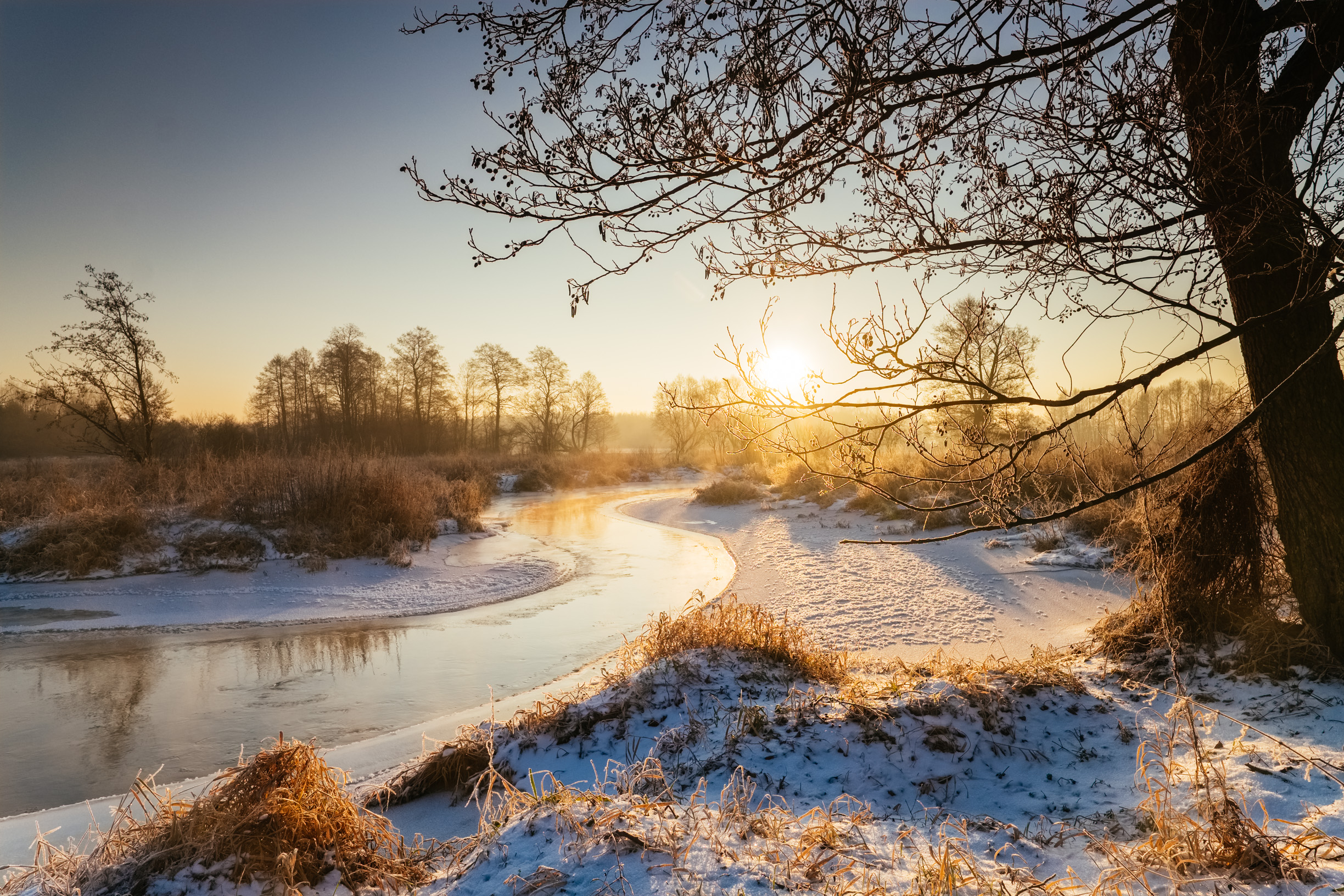
- Bolimów Landscape Park

- Flag Coat of arms
- Interactive map of Gmina Nieborów
- Coordinates (Nieborów): 52°8′N 20°7′E
- Country: Poland
- Voivodeship: Łódź
- County: Łowicz
- Seat: Nieborów

Area
  - Total: 103.29 km^{2} (39.88 sq mi)

Population (2006)
  - Total: 9,536
  - Density: 92.32/km^{2} (239.1/sq mi)
- Website: www.nieborow.pl

Gmina Nieborów is a rural gmina (administrative district) in Łowicz County, Łódź Voivodeship, in central Poland. Its seat is the village of Nieborów, which lies approximately 14 kilometres (9 mi) east of Łowicz and 60 km (37 mi) north-east of the regional capital Łódź.

The gmina covers an area of 103.29 square kilometres (39.9 sq mi), and as of 2006 its total population is 9,536.

The gmina contains part of the protected area called Bolimów Landscape Park.

== Villages ==
Gmina Nieborów contains the villages and settlements of:

- Arkadia
- Bednary-Kolonia
- Bednary-Wieś
- Bełchów
- Bobrowniki
- Chyleniec
- Dzierzgów
- Dzierzgówek
- Janowice
- Julianów
- Karolew
- Kompina
- Michałówek
- Mysłaków
- Nieborów
- Patoki
- Piaski
- Sypień
- Zygmuntów

== Neighbouring gminas ==
Gmina Nieborów is bordered by the town of Łowicz and by the gminas of Bolimów, Kocierzew Południowy, Łowicz, Łyszkowice, Nowa Sucha and Skierniewice.
