= Michał Gedeon Radziwiłł =

Polish noble (1778–1850)

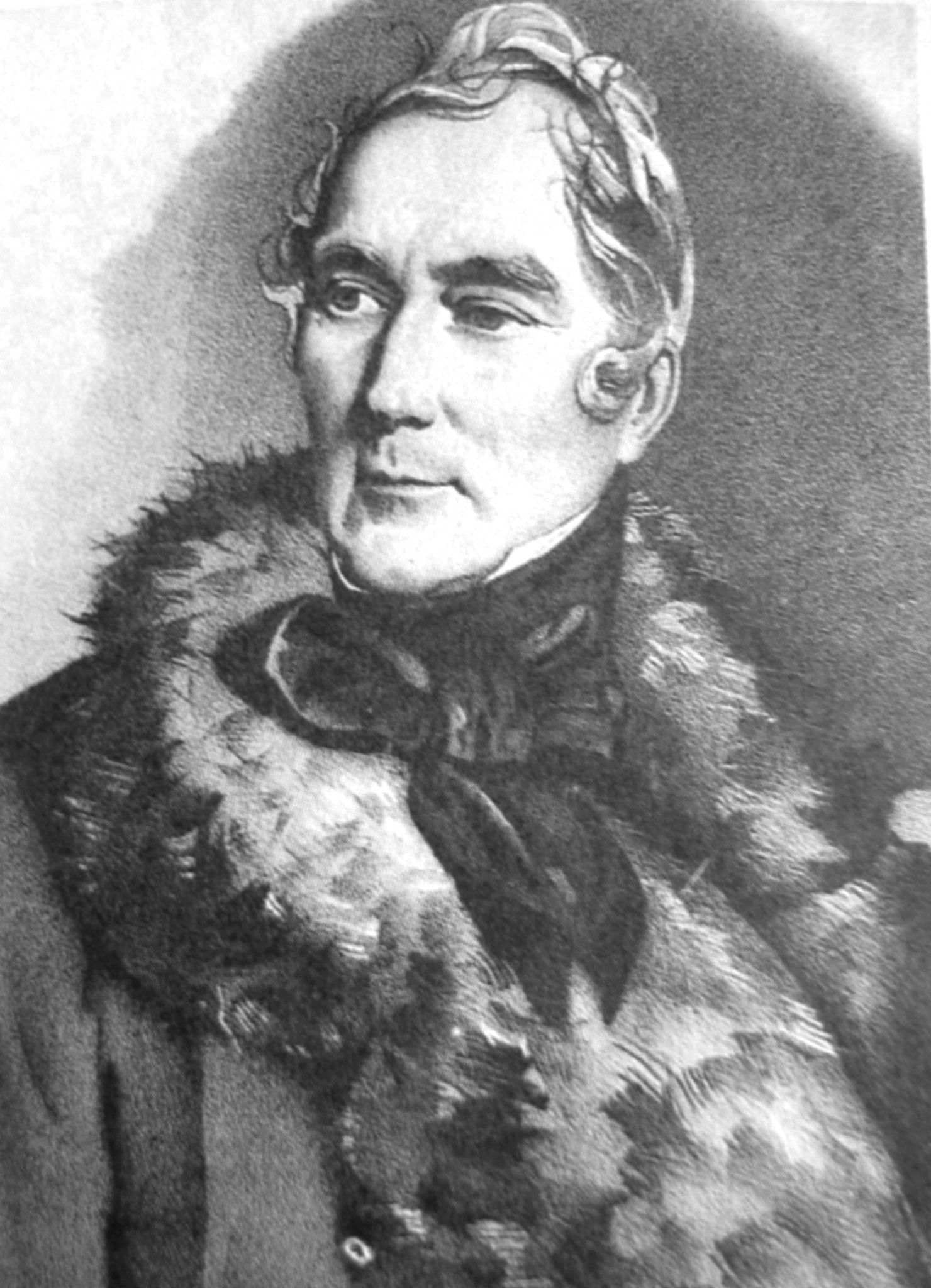
- Born: Michał Gedeon Hieronim Radziwiłł; 24 September 1778; Warsaw, Polish–Lithuanian Commonwealth
- Died: 24 May 1850 (aged 71); Warsaw, Congress Poland, Russian Empire
- Title: Prince
- Spouse: Aleksandra Stecka
- Children: Michalina Radziwiłł; Karol Andrzej Radziwiłł; Zygmunt Radziwiłł
- Parents: Michał Hieronim Radziwiłł (father); Helena Przeździecka (mother)
- Relatives: Radziwiłł

Michał Gedeon Hieronim Radziwiłł (24 September 1778 – 24 May 1850) was a Polish noble, senator, and the owner of Nieborów. A member of the Radziwiłł family from Nieśwież, he was a military officer who fought in several battles such as the Kościuszko Uprising.

== Life ==
Michał Gedeon Hieronim Radziwiłł was born on 24 September 1778, in Warsaw, Polish–Lithuanian Commonwealth, to parents Michał Hieronim Radziwiłł and Helena Radziwiłł (née Przeździecka). He was a member of the Radziwiłł family, a Polish-Lithuanian noble family.

== Service ==
Radziwiłł participated in the Kościuszko Uprising of 1794. By January 1807, he had risen to the rank of colonel and became the commander of the Legion-du-Nord, later leading the 5th Infantry Regiment in the Duchy of Warsaw. He played a significant role in the Siege of Gdańsk and was subsequently stationed there with his regiment. In 1811, he was promoted to brigadier general.

During the 1812 campaign, Radziwiłł commanded an infantry brigade in the Polish division under General Grandjean, which was part of Jacques MacDonald’s 10th Army Corps. He defended Gdańsk in 1813 under General Jean Rapp, but was captured when the fortress surrendered. In 1815, he resigned from military service and returned in Nieborów.

During the November Uprising of 1830-31, Radziwiłł served as Commander-in-Chief of the Polish forces and led the Polish troops at the Battle of Grochów. After the uprising's failure, he was exiled to Yaroslavl in Russia. He returned to Poland in 1836 and spent his final years in Warsaw, where he died 24 May 1850.
