= Bełchów =

- Village
- Location within Poland
- Coordinates: 52°2′N 20°4′E
- Country: Poland
- Voivodeship: Łódź
- County: Łowicz
- Gmina: Nieborów
- Population: 2,000

Bełchów [ˈbɛu̯xuf] is a village in the administrative district of Gmina Nieborów, within Łowicz County, Łódź Voivodeship, central Poland.
