= Kompina =

- Village
- Location within Poland
- Coordinates: 52°8′10″N 20°4′41″E
- Country: Poland
- Voivodeship: Łódź
- County: Łowicz
- Gmina: Nieborów
- Elevation: 81 m (266 ft)
- Population: 411

Kompina [kɔmˈpina] is a village in the administrative district of Gmina Nieborów, within Łowicz County, Łódź Voivodeship, in central Poland.
