= Bednary-Kolonia =

Village in Poland

- Village
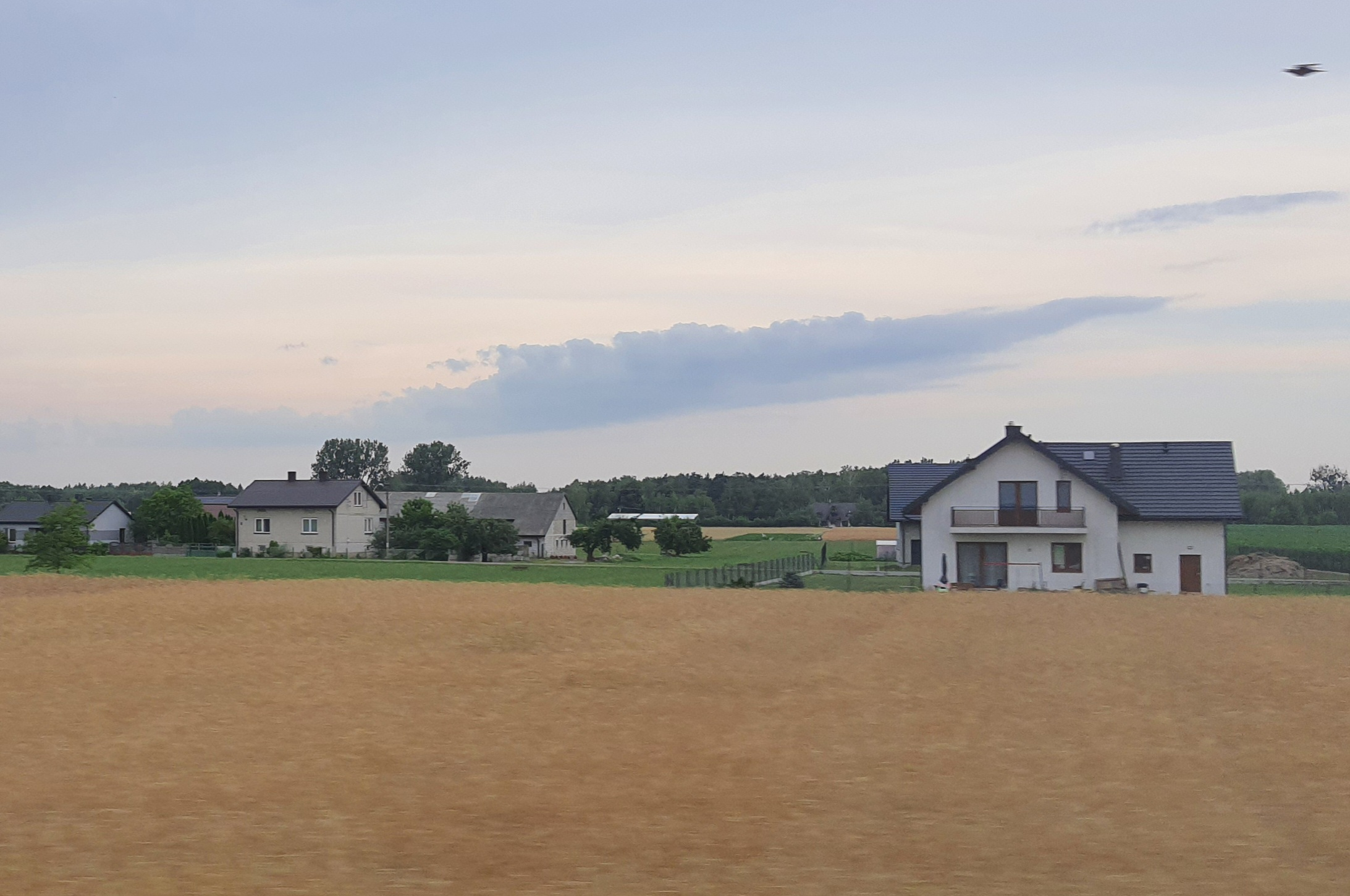

- Location within Poland
- Coordinates: 52°6′59″N 20°5′19″E
- Country: Poland
- Voivodeship: Łódź
- County: Łowicz
- Gmina: Nieborów
- Population: 370

Bednary-Kolonia [bɛdˈnarɨ kɔˈlɔɲa] is a village in the administrative district of Gmina Nieborów, within Łowicz County, Łódź Voivodeship, in central Poland.
