= Chyleniec =

- Village
- Location within Poland
- Coordinates: 52°2′N 20°5′E
- Country: Poland
- Voivodeship: Łódź
- County: Łowicz
- Gmina: Nieborów

Chyleniec [xɨˈlɛɲɛt͡s] is a village in the administrative district of Gmina Nieborów, within Łowicz County, Łódź Voivodeship, in central Poland.
