= Patoki, Łowicz County =

Patoki
- Village
- Location within Poland
- Coordinates: 52°8′25″N 20°6′0″E
- Country: Poland
- Voivodeship: Łódź
- County: Łowicz
- Gmina: Nieborów

Patoki [paˈtɔki] is a village in the administrative district of Gmina Nieborów, within Łowicz County, Łódź Voivodeship, in central Poland.
