= Bednary-Wieś =

- Village
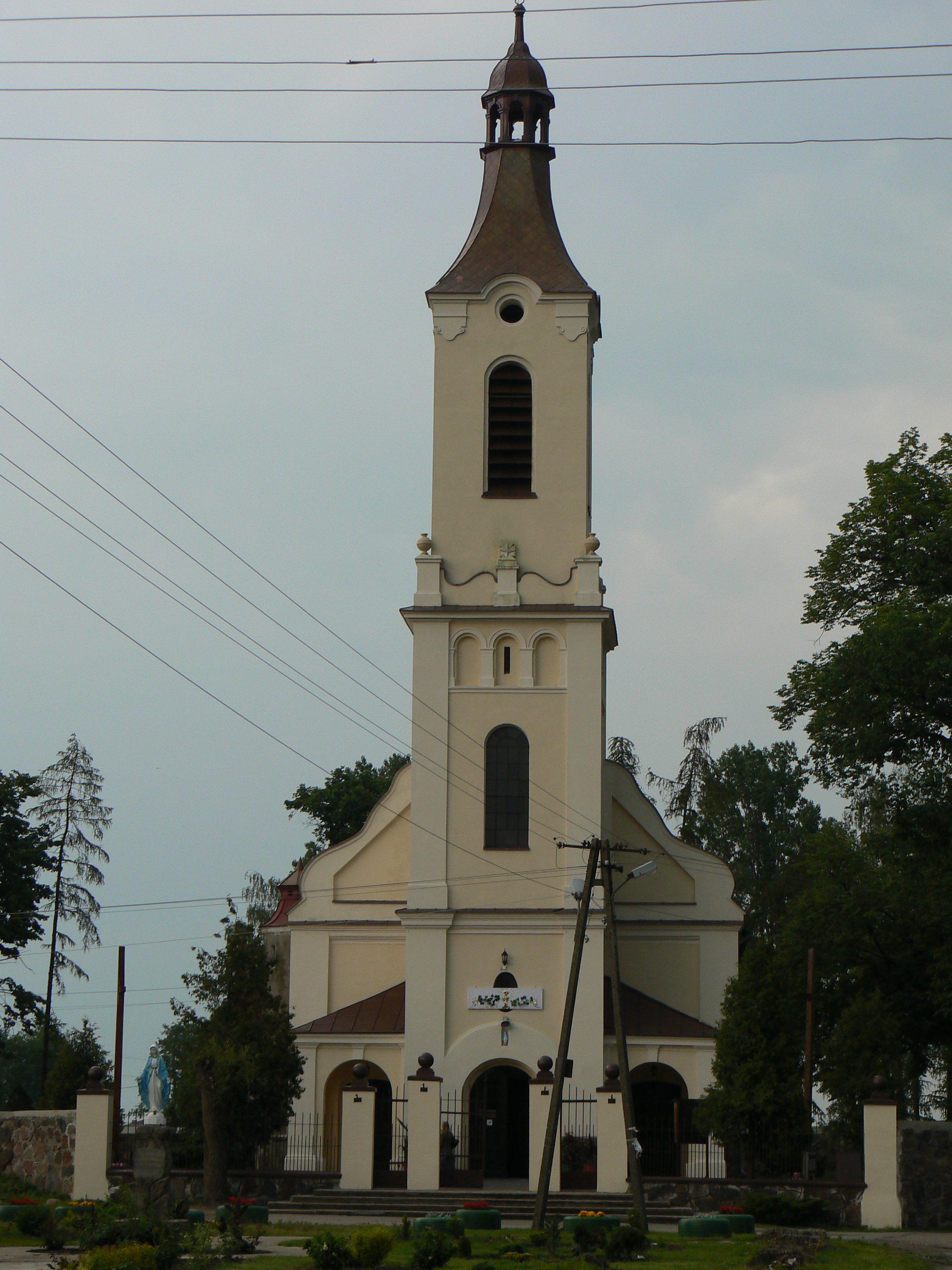

- Location within Poland
- Coordinates: 52°6′16″N 20°3′37″E
- Country: Poland
- Voivodeship: Łódź
- County: Łowicz
- Gmina: Nieborów
- Population: 1,000

Bednary-Wieś [bɛdˈnarɨ ˈvjɛɕ] is a village in the administrative district of Gmina Nieborów, within Łowicz County, Łódź Voivodeship, in central Poland.
