= Dzierzgów, Łódź Voivodeship =

Dzierzgów
- Village
- Location within Poland
- Coordinates: 52°2′46″N 20°2′4″E
- Country: Poland
- Voivodeship: Łódź
- County: Łowicz
- Gmina: Nieborów

Dzierzgów [ˈd͡ʑɛʐɡuf] is a village in the administrative district of Gmina Nieborów, within Łowicz County, Łódź Voivodeship, in central Poland.
