= Dzierzgówek, Łódź Voivodeship =

Dzierzgówek
- Village
- Location within Poland
- Coordinates: 52°02′15″N 20°00′45″E
- Country: Poland
- Voivodeship: Łódź
- County: Łowicz
- Gmina: Nieborów

Dzierzgówek [d͡ʑɛʐˈɡuvɛk] is a village in the administrative district of Gmina Nieborów, within Łowicz County, Łódź Voivodeship, in central Poland.
