= Zur Namensfeier =

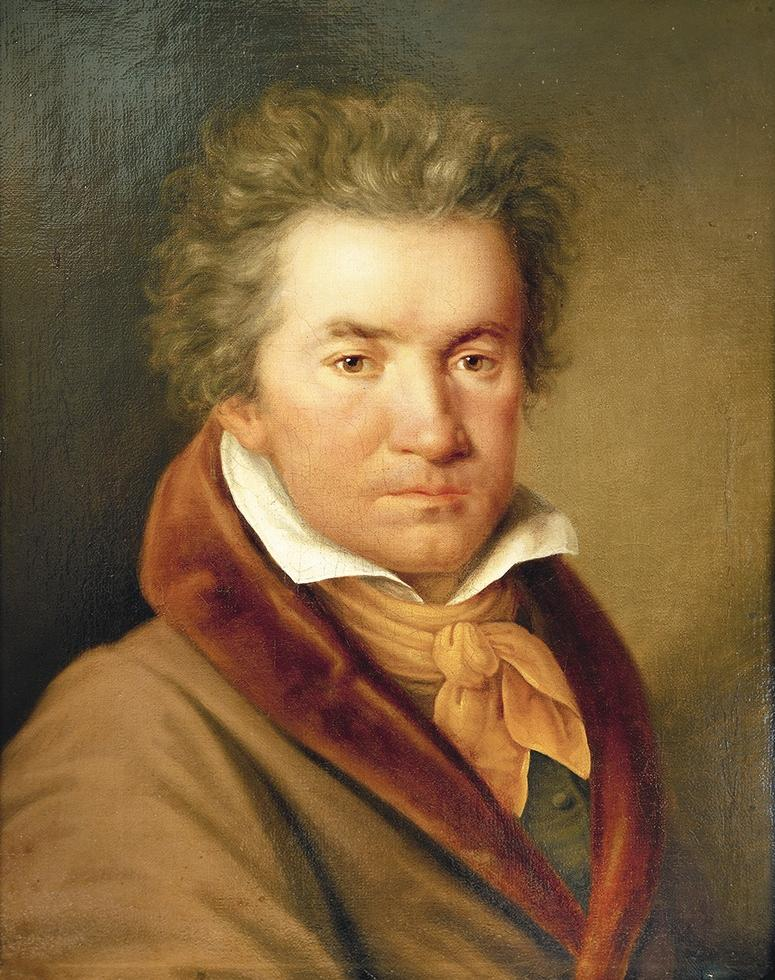
Ludwig van Beethoven (age 44) depicted in a portrait by Joseph Willibrord Mähler (1815)

Zur Namensfeier (English: For the Name Day), Op. 115, is a symphonic overture in C major by Ludwig van Beethoven, completed in 1815 and first performed on Christmas Day 1815. It is dedicated to Polish prince Antoni Radziwiłł, who is remembered for his patronage of the arts who supported others like Paganini, Goethe and Chopin. The piece was never one of Beethoven's more popular works and is seldom played today. Sketches for the overture are spread out over five years, with some of the earliest dating from 1809, making this a likely candidate for the first non-theatrical concert overture ever written.

Its title refers to the feast of St Francis of Assisi, 4 October, the name day of the Austrian emperor Franz I, and while Beethoven made an attempt to complete the work for this day in 1814, he was unable to finish it in time, so he set aside work on it until the following spring. The theme at the beginning is related to that which he used to set Schiller's "Ode to Joy" in his Ninth Symphony nine years later.

In spite of its late opus number, it is a middle-period composition. Beethoven used ideas which he had sketched between 1810 and 1814; his earliest "late period" compositions are usually dated to 1816.

The work went through several different publishers: it was initially sent to a Scottish publisher in Edinburgh, George Thomson, to whom Beethoven stated that it was among "the most difficult undertakings in [my] musical composition", referring to his inability to complete the score and the evidence of his artistic struggle on the manuscript. In April 1815, the composition was sold, along with the overtures to King Stephen and The Ruins of Athens, to Austrian publisher Sigmund Anton Steiner, who would later publish the Seventh and Eighth symphonies and Wellington's Victory. Steiner subsequently delayed the publication of Op. 115, and the work did not appear until the end of Beethoven's life – resulting in the late opus number.

== Instrumentation ==
The overture is scored for two flutes, two oboes, two soprano clarinets in C, two bassoons, two trumpets in C, four French horns in C, timpani in C and G, and strings.
