= Piaski, Łowicz County =

Piaski
- Village
- Location within Poland
- Coordinates: 52°3′23″N 20°6′1″E
- Country: Poland
- Voivodeship: Łódź
- County: Łowicz
- Gmina: Nieborów

Population
  - Total: 300
- Time zone: UTC+1 (CET)
  - Summer (DST): UTC+2 (CEST)
- Postal code: 99-416
- Vehicle registration: ELC

Piaski (Polish pronunciation: [ˈpjaskʲi]) is a village in the administrative district of Gmina Nieborów, within Łowicz County, Łódź Voivodeship, in central Poland.
