= Janowice, Łowicz County =

Janowice
- Village
- Location within Poland
- Coordinates: 52°6′55″N 20°2′2″E
- Country: Poland
- Voivodeship: Łódź
- County: Łowicz
- Gmina: Nieborów

Janowice [janɔˈvit͡sɛ] is a village in the administrative district of Gmina Nieborów, within Łowicz County, Łódź Voivodeship, in central Poland.
