= Bobrowniki, Łowicz County =

Bobrowniki
- Village
- Location within Poland
- Coordinates: 52°3′52″N 20°1′10″E
- Country: Poland
- Voivodeship: Łódź
- County: Łowicz
- Gmina: Nieborów
- Population: 1,200

Bobrowniki [bɔbrɔvˈniki] is a village in the administrative district of Gmina Nieborów, within Łowicz County, Łódź Voivodeship, in central Poland.
