= Mysłaków, Łódź Voivodeship =

Mysłaków
- Village
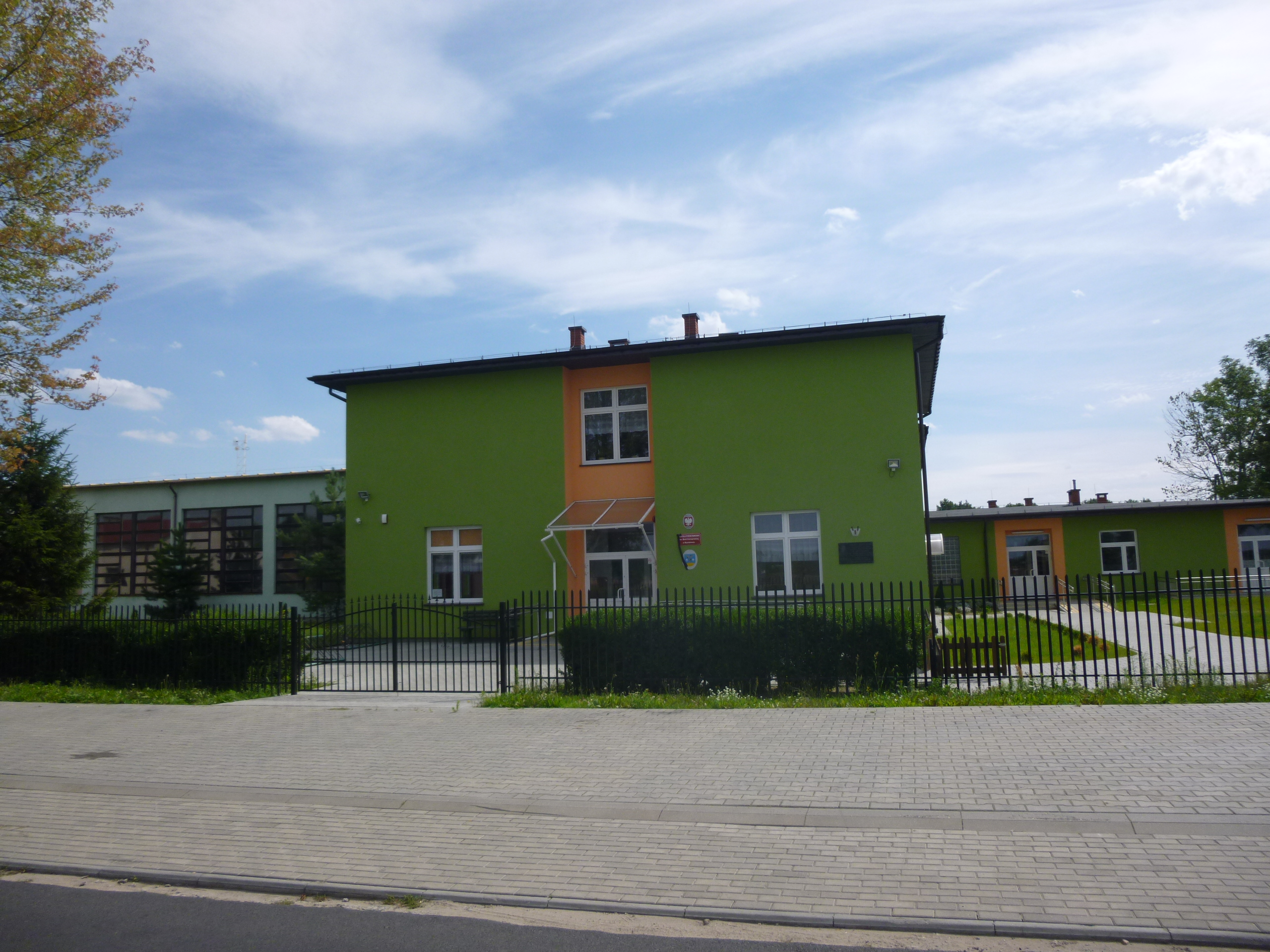
- Maria Konopnicka Primary School in Mysłaków

- Location within Poland
- Coordinates: 52°5′23″N 20°0′57″E
- Country: Poland
- Voivodeship: Łódź
- County: Łowicz
- Gmina: Nieborów
- Population: 1,040

Mysłaków [mɨˈswakuf] is a village in the administrative district of Gmina Nieborów, within Łowicz County, Łódź Voivodeship, in central Poland.
