= Michałówek, Łowicz County =

Michałówek
- Village
- Location within Poland
- Coordinates: 52°2′29″N 20°4′30″E
- Country: Poland
- Voivodeship: Łódź
- County: Łowicz
- Gmina: Nieborów

Michałówek [mixaˈwuvɛk] is a village in the administrative district of Gmina Nieborów, within Łowicz County, Łódź Voivodeship, in central Poland.
