= Michał Hieronim Radziwiłł =

Polish nobleman (1744–1831)

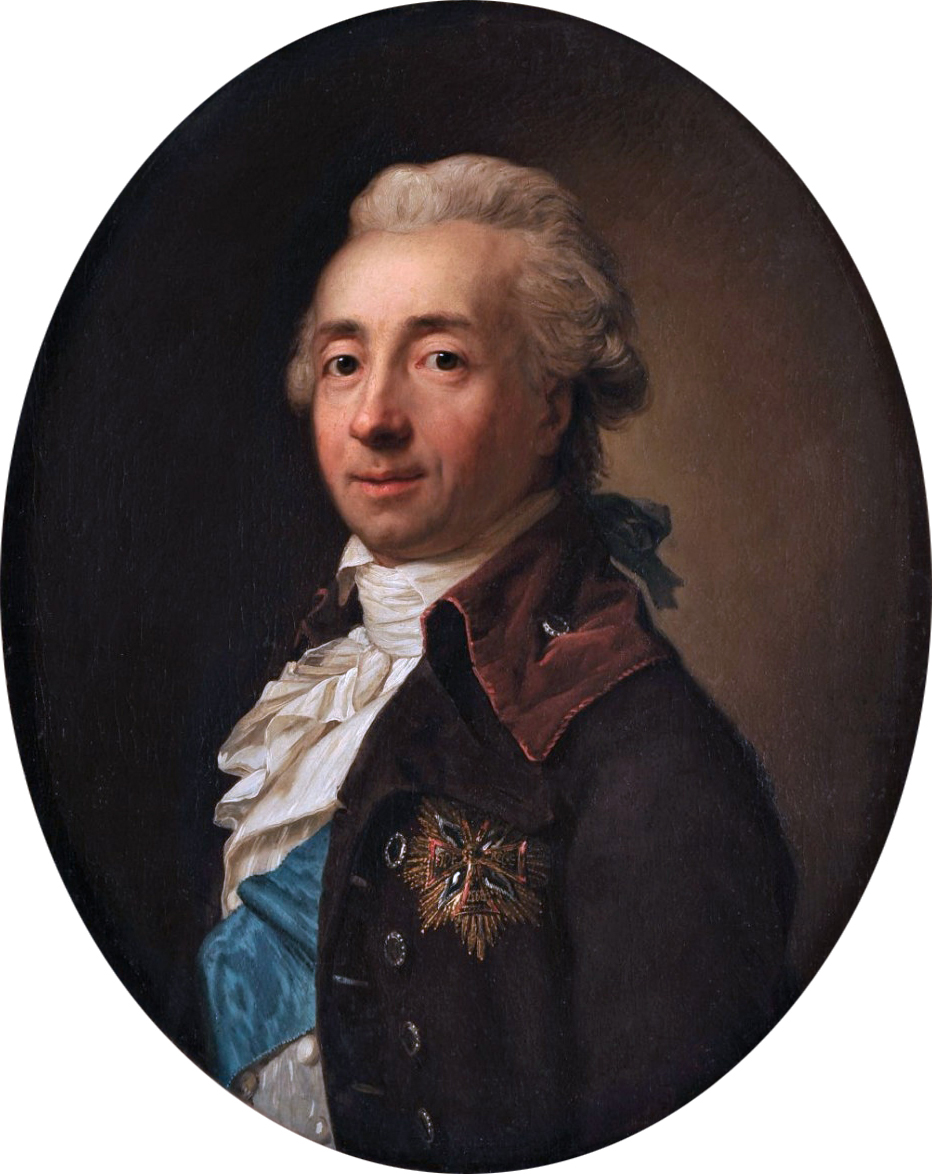
- Portrait by Anton Graff, 1785
- Born: 13 September 1744; Kraków, Polish–Lithuanian Commonwealth
- Died: 2 May 1831 (aged 86); Warsaw, Congress Poland, Russian Empire
- Spouse: Helena Przeździecka
- Children: Ludwik Mikołaj Radziwiłł; Antoni Henryk Radziwiłł; Krystyna Magdalena Radziwiłł; Michał Gedeon Radziwiłł; Karol Lukasz Radziwiłł; Andrzej Walentyn Radziwiłł; Aniela Radziwiłł; Róża Katarzyna Radziwiłł
- Parents: Marcin Mikołaj Radziwiłł (father); Marta Trembicka (mother)

Prince Michał Hieronim Radziwiłł (Lithuanian: Mykolas Jeronimas Radvila; 13 September 1744 – 2 May 1831) was a Polish–Lithuanian nobleman, politician, diplomat and member of the Radziwiłł family. He was an ordynat of Kleck, Olyka and Niasvizh, Great Sword-bearer of Lithuania from 1771, castellan of Vilnius from 1775, voivode of Vilnius from 1790, starost grabowski, komorowski, kraszewicki, and miksztadzki. He also held a position of Marshal during the Partition Sejm, together with Adam Poniński.

He was a Knight of the Order of the White Eagle (awarded on 7 September 1773) and a holder of the Order of the Black Eagle. His paternal great-grandfather was Dominik Mikołaj Radziwiłł. He was married to Helena Przeździecka from 26 April 1771, their son was Antoni Radziwiłł.

== Biography ==
Born into the House of Radziwiłł, the second son of Prince Marcin Mikołaj Radziwiłł (1705-1782) and his second wife, Marta Trembicka (d. 1812), he was neglected until his father was incapacitated (which took place in 1748). His brother was the voivode Józef Mikołaj Radziwiłł.

He received a thorough education and married Helena Przezdziecka, known for her affair with King Stanisław August.

He was the owner of numerous goods, he became famous as a good farmer. During his rule, the ponds in the Przygodzice estates located near Ostrów Wielkopolski became one of the most significant in Poland and Europe. In Nieborów, he amassed a considerable collection of works of art, including paintings by Paulus Potter, Nicolas Poussin, Nicolas Lancret, Élisabeth Vigée-Lebrun.

He became the marshal of Brześć in the Radom Confederation. In the attachment to the telegram of October 2 of 1767, to the president of the College of Foreign Affairs of the Russian Empire, Nikita Panin, the Russian envoy described him as the person responsible for the implementation of Russian plans at the Sejm of 1767, and the envoy of the Brest-Litovsk district to the Sejm of 1767. On October 23 of 1767, he joined the delegation of the Sejm, selected under the pressure of the Russian envoy Nikolai Repnin, established in order to define the system of the Republic of Poland. Marshal of the confederation of the Grand Duchy of Lithuania established at the Partition Seym in Warsaw in 1773. As an MP in Brzesko-Lithuania, he was part of the delegation selected under the pressure of diplomats of the three partitioning countries, which was to carry out the partition. On September 18, 1773, he signed the treaties of assignment by the Polish- Lithuanian Commonwealth of lands seized by Russia, Prussia and Austria in the first partition of Poland. Member of Andrzej Mokronowski's confederation in 1776. Member of the Military Department of the Perpetual Council in 1783.

He signed the documents sanctioning the partitions in 1793 at the last partition parliament. He became a member of the Lithuanian Distribution Commission, established to liquidate the assets of the Jesuit order dissolved in the Republic of Poland. In the years 1773-1775, he collected 1,000 red zlotys a month from the common treasury of three partitioning manors. He was a member of the confederation of the Four-Year Sejm. He was included in the list of deputies and senators of the Russian envoy Yakov Bulgakov in 1792, which contained a list of people whom the Russians could count on in reconfederation and the overthrow of the work on May 3. At the Grodno Seym in 1793, he was appointed by King Stanisław August Poniatowski as a member of the deputation for dealings with the Russian envoy Jakob Sievers. On July 22, 1793, he signed a treaty of assignment by the Republic of lands seized by Russia in the Second Partition of Poland. The Grodno Seym (1793) nominated him to the Permanent Council and the Commission of National Education.

In 1773 he was made a knight of the Order of Saint Stanislaus.

With the money he received from Russia for signing the partition acts, he bought the palace in Nieborów together with the surrounding land in 1774. Julian Ursyn Niemcewicz wrote about Michał that he was in the last way selfish, a bad citizen, inactive. In 1816, he also purchased the Królikarnia Palace.

In 1812 he joined the General Confederation of the Kingdom of Poland.

He had five sons, including Antoni Henryk Radziwiłł and Michał Gedeon Radziwiłł, and three daughters.

He died in Warsaw at the age of 87. He was buried in Nieborów He was probably the last living secular senator of the Polish-Lithuanian Commonwealth. Decorated with the Order of the White Eagle (1773), the Order of Saint Stanislaus (1773), the Prussian Order of the Black Eagle and the Order of the Red Eagle, the Bavarian Order of Saint Hubert, Knight of Malta from 1797
