= Julianów, Łowicz County =

Julianów
- Village
- Location within Poland
- Coordinates: 52°5′18″N 20°3′52″E
- Country: Poland
- Voivodeship: Łódź
- County: Łowicz
- Gmina: Nieborów

Julianów [juˈljanuf] is a village in the administrative district of Gmina Nieborów, within Łowicz County, Łódź Voivodeship, in central Poland.
