= Nieborów Palace =

Historic building in Poland

Coordinates: 52°04′00″N 20°04′13″E

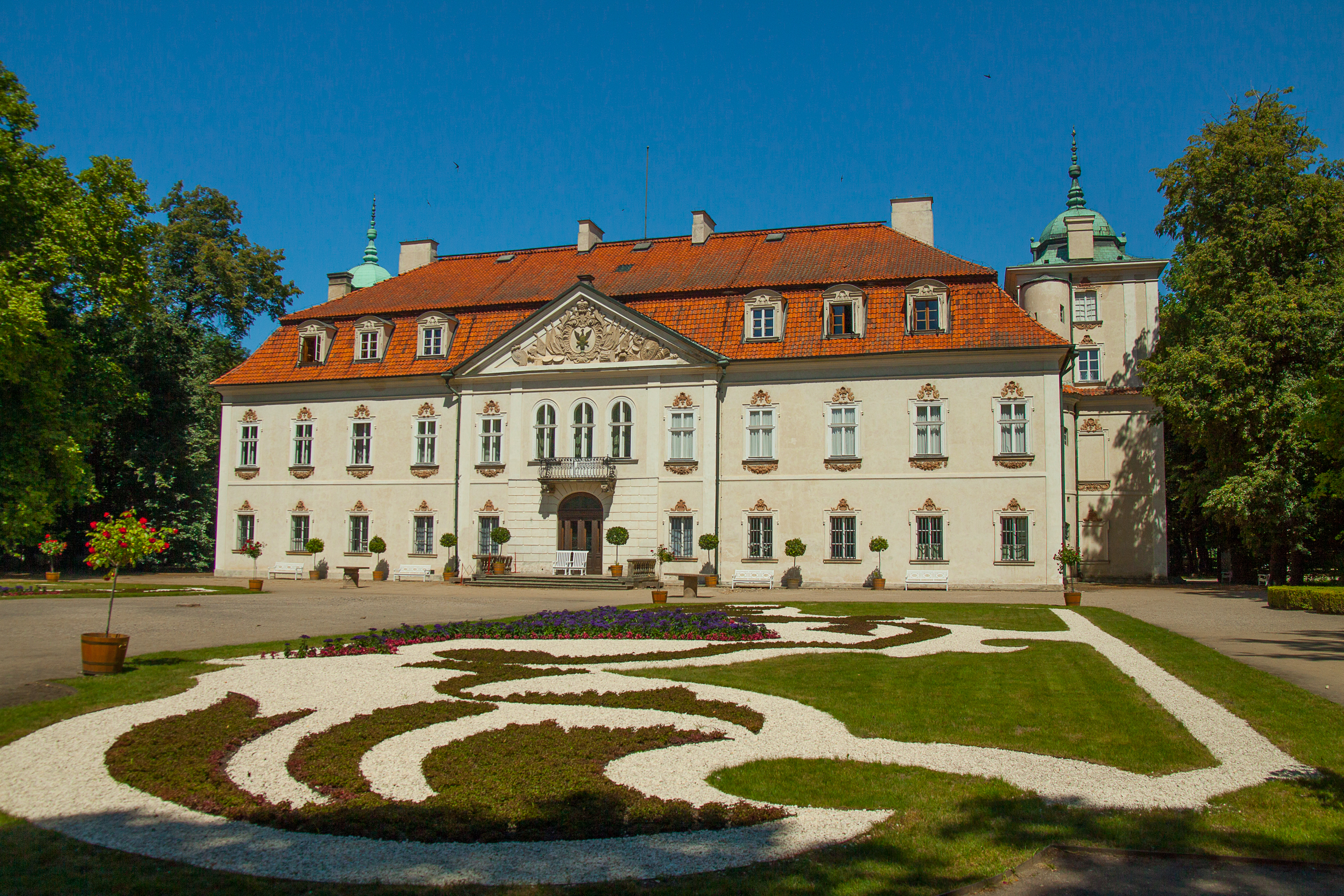
- View from the garden
- Interactive map of the Nieborów Palace area

General information
- Architectural style: Baroque
- Location: Nieborów, Łowicz County, Łódź Voivodeship, Poland
- Construction started: 1695
- Completed: 1697
- Client: Michał Stefan Radziejowski

Design and construction
- Architect: Tylman van Gameren

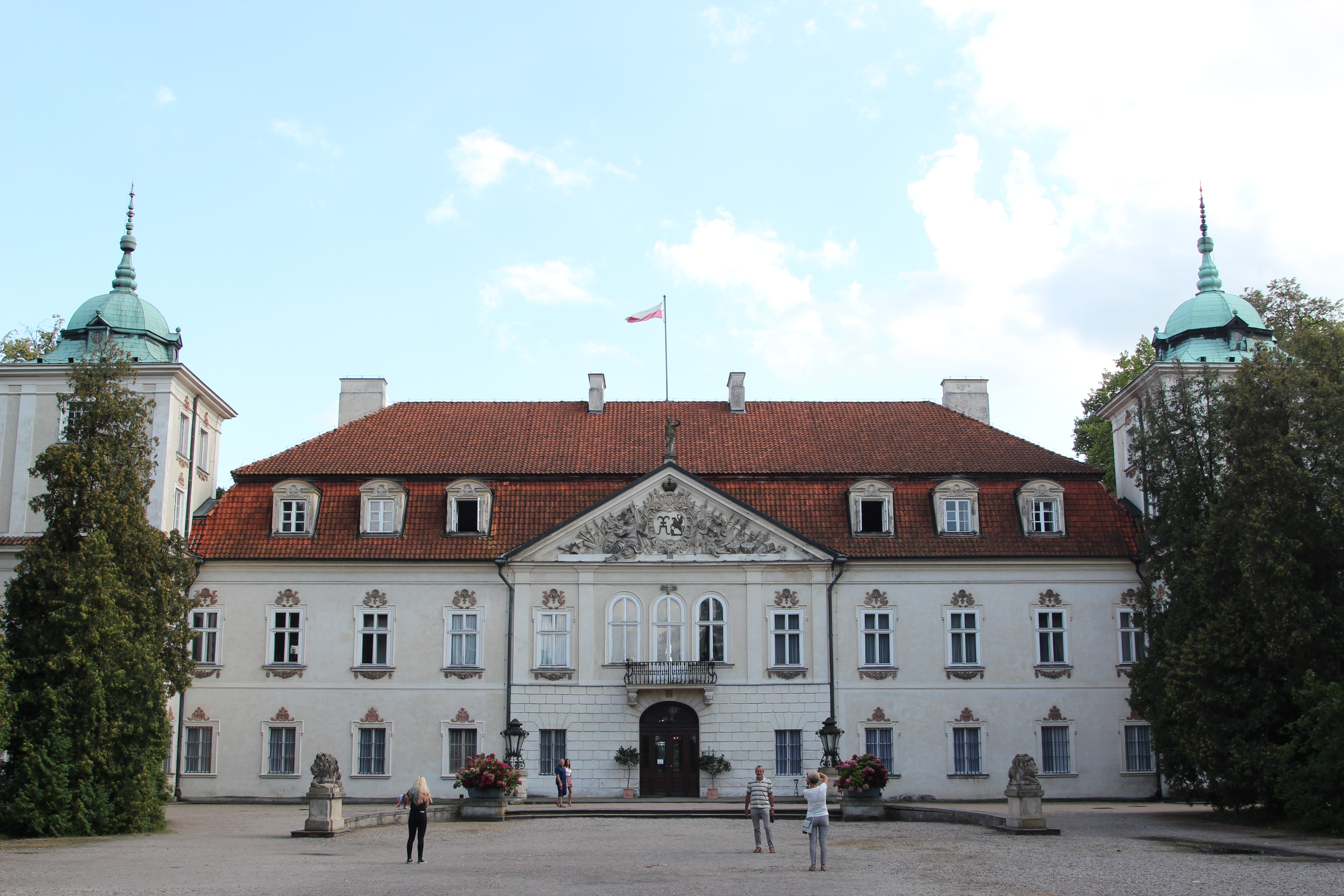
The front view of the palace

Nieborów Palace (Polish: Pałac w Nieborowie; pronounced: [ɲɛˈbɔruf]) is a palace located in the village of Nieborów, Łódź Voivodeship in Poland. Built in the 17th century by one of the greatest Baroque architects, Tylman van Gameren, the building belongs to one of the most renowned of Poland's aristocratic residences and serves as a museum of interior design of palace residences from the 17th to the 19th century, based on the surviving furniture and collections, featuring portraits of eminent personalities of the era, several thousand drawings and sketches, books (from the 16th century), porcelain and textiles.

Nieborów originates from the end of the 12th century with the creation of a village including a church built in 1314 and a wooden mansion. At the beginning of 16th century a Gothic-Renaissance manor was built. It lasted until the end of 17th century, by which time Niebórow was owned by Nieborowski clan of the Prawda (Truth) Coat of Arms.

The residential complex consists of a palace, coach house, manufactory, outbuilding, orangery and two parks – a formal park and an English-style park.

== History ==
A wooden mansion, which had been there since the Middle Ages, was replaced by a much more representative, Gothic-Renaissance building in the 16th century. The erection of the current residence was ordered by the contemporary archbishop of Gniezno Michał Radziejowski, and it commenced in 1690. The residence was finally built in 1696 on the primate's grounds, previously owned by the Nieborowski clan.

After the archbishop's death, the residence was inherited by Jerzy Hipolit Towianski and Konstancja of Niszczycki clan. Their son Krzysztof sold the estate to Aleksander Jakub Lubomirski and Karolina Fryderyka von Vitzthum. Since the year 1736, it was owned by brothers Stanislaw and Jan Jozef Lochocki.

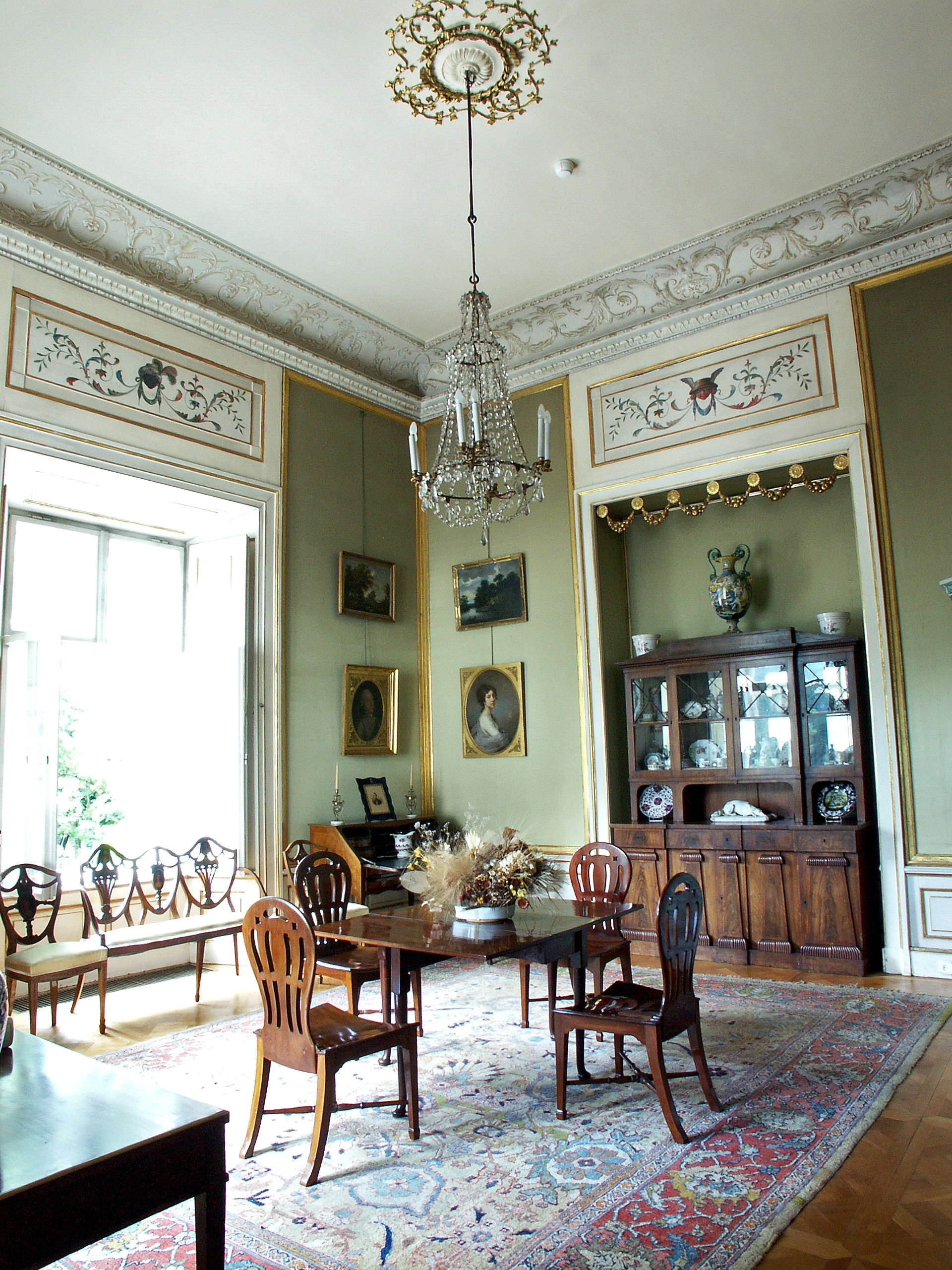
The Green Study Room

The estate had its prime with various owners – The Great Hetman of Lithuania Michal Kazimierz Oginski (1766–1774) and Michael Hieronim and Helena of Radziwill clan, who was also the creator of nearby Arkadia. During their presence in the mansion, its interior has been pompously furnished with rococo and early classicist ornaments designed by Szymon Bogumił Zug.

After Michael Oginski died, the estate started to fall into decline. Its successors were too busy quarrelling among each other to actually take care of the mansion. The straw that broke the camel's back was the squandering of family assets (including Arkadia) by Zygmunt Radziwill, who, in addition, sold the best pieces of art gathered in Nieborów at an auction in Paris.

Fortunately, Zygmunt gave over the estate to his nephew Michael Piotr Radziwill in 1879, before fleeing to France. Prince Michael has proven to be a good landlord – he has restored Nieborów estate to its former glory, and also bought back the Arkadia. Michael Piotr Radziwill died in 1903 without an heir. The estate was given over to this distant cousin Janusz Radziwill. In 1922, he ordered to build a second floor, which was very skilfully integrated into the tall, baroque roof, without any interference with the building's silhouette. The interior has also been rebuilt by design of Romuald Gutt.

Nieborów has become a meeting place for many eminences in the interwar period, as Janusz Radziwill was very active in politics. During the German occupation of Poland in World War II, Janusz was an active member of resistance and, as such, held captive by both Germans and NKVD (Russian People's Commissariat for Internal Affairs). In that time, the estate was managed by Edmund Radziwill, Janusz's son, along with his wife, Izabela. Both Edmund and Izabela were members of AK (the Home Army, which was a Polish resistance movement). As the Red Army advanced in early 1945, ransacking and seizing the properties of the aristorcatic families, who were seen as the enemies of the working class, the museum's director, Stanisław Lorentz, put up a sign informing that Nieborow was a branch of the state-owned museum and no longer private property of the aristocracy, which saved Nieborow from looting and destruction.

After the war, both the estate and the garden of Arkadia were taken over by the state and became subsidiaries of the National Museum in Warsaw; in 1945, the writer Mieczysław Smolarski was in charge.

The palace appeared in many films and TV series including Andrzej Wajda's 1959 film Lotna, Walerian Borowczyk's 1975 film The Story of Sin, Krzysztof Gradowski's 1983 fantasy film Mr. Kleks' Academy as well as TV series Father Matthew and Plebania. In 2015, it was nominated in a National Geographic plebiscite for the "New Seven Wonders of Poland".

== Architecture ==
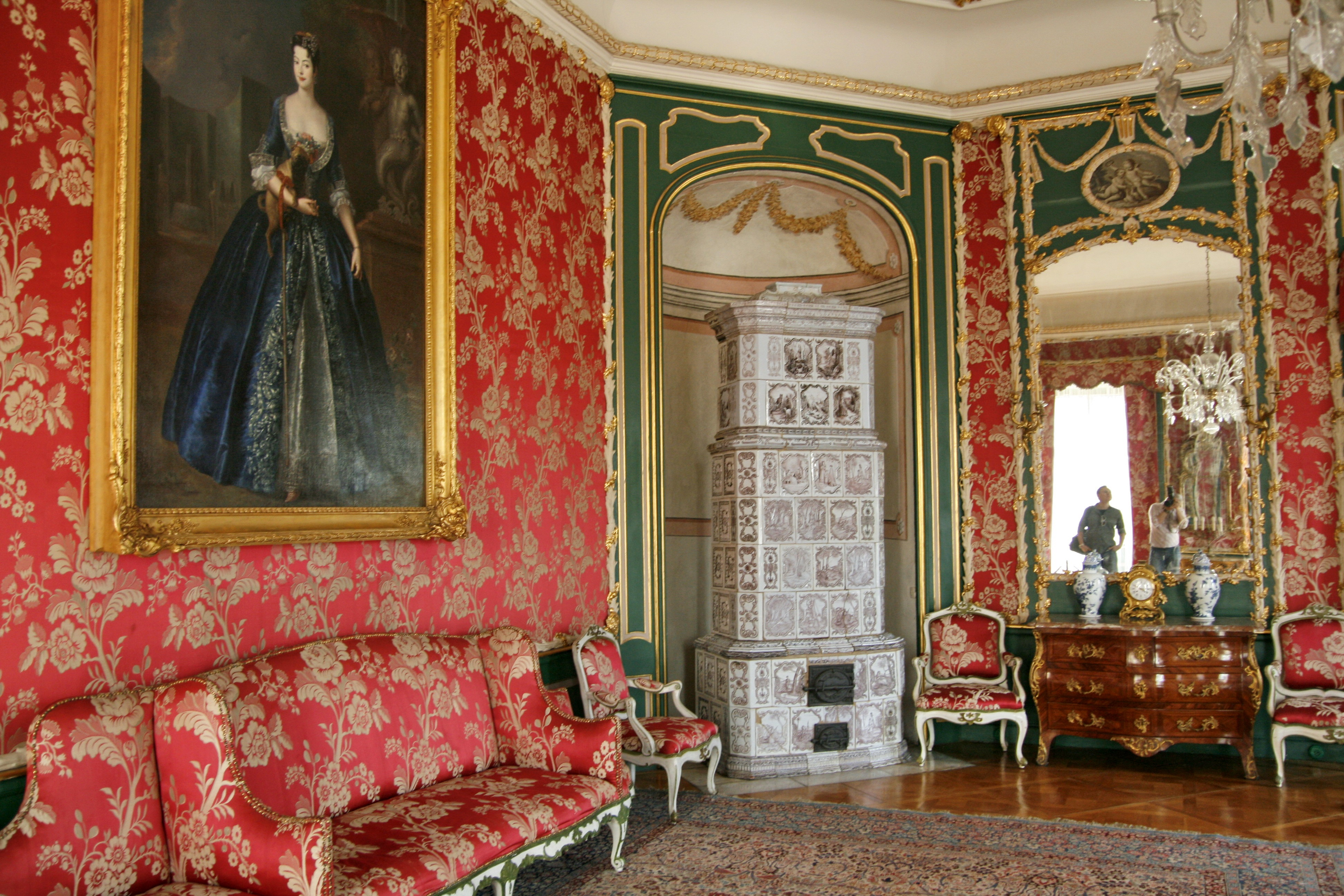
The Red Salon

Neborow Estate has been designed by the greatest architect of that time – Tylman of Gameren. The storied, baroque edifice was covered with a tall, layered roof. There are towers by the courtyard, slightly on the side, and the whole estate is surrounded by a vast, geometric French formal garden. The manor itself is a two-storied building, the ground floor being covered by a mansard roof from the 1922 reconstruction. It has been built on a rectangular outline, with two angular towers on the northern side. The towers are decorated with bossage, pilasters, cornices and blind windows and are roofed with tented roofs. Northern and southern façades have ostensible avant-corpses, separated by cornices on the sides. The avant-corpses contain tympanums with stucco reliefs and coat-of-arms cartouches. The middle part of the building containing the vestibule is the only remain after the original, 16th century manor.

The building has a two-section interior. The mansion may pride itself with rich endowing. Right by the entrance, in the vestibule there are copies of famous sculptures – Head of Niobe and the Roman Bust, as well as the unique theatrical lamp from the 18th century. Four sandstone portals lead to the vestibule. On the left side there is the main staircase, which has walls and ceiling covered by azure Dutch tiles. There are various portraits on the walls, including those of the last Polish king Stanisław II Augustus, Hetman Stefan Czarniecki and king John III Sobieski. The stairs lead to the first floor, where the residential White Hall is located – formerly a ballroom and a chapel. In one of its corners, there is a copy of Saint Cecilia's sculpture.

Next to the White Hall there is a classicistic Yellow Study with a very interesting exhibit – a harmonica made of glass. There is also a bedroom with portraits of the Radziwill clan and a set of furniture. The library of the estate contains approximately 12 thousand volumes in stylish bindings. Another precious showpieces of this hall are two globes from the 17th century on pedestals, which were bought in 1805 from Louis XVIII, who later became the king of France.

The Small Dining Room draws attention with its furniture from the turn of 18th and 19th century, as well as with a series of portraits depicting Polish kings, painted by renowned Polish-Italian painter Marcello Bacciarelli. Another interesting room is a rococo Red Study, which came into being during the 1766–1768 reconstruction by Michal Kazimierz Oginski. Its main feature is a portrait of Anna Orzelska, who was a bastard daughter of king August II and Henryk Renard. The Study is fitted with French furniture. On the first floor one can also see: the Voivode's Bedroom, the Duke's Bedroom, as well as Boudoir and the Green Study, which are located in the towers.

== Surrounding park ==
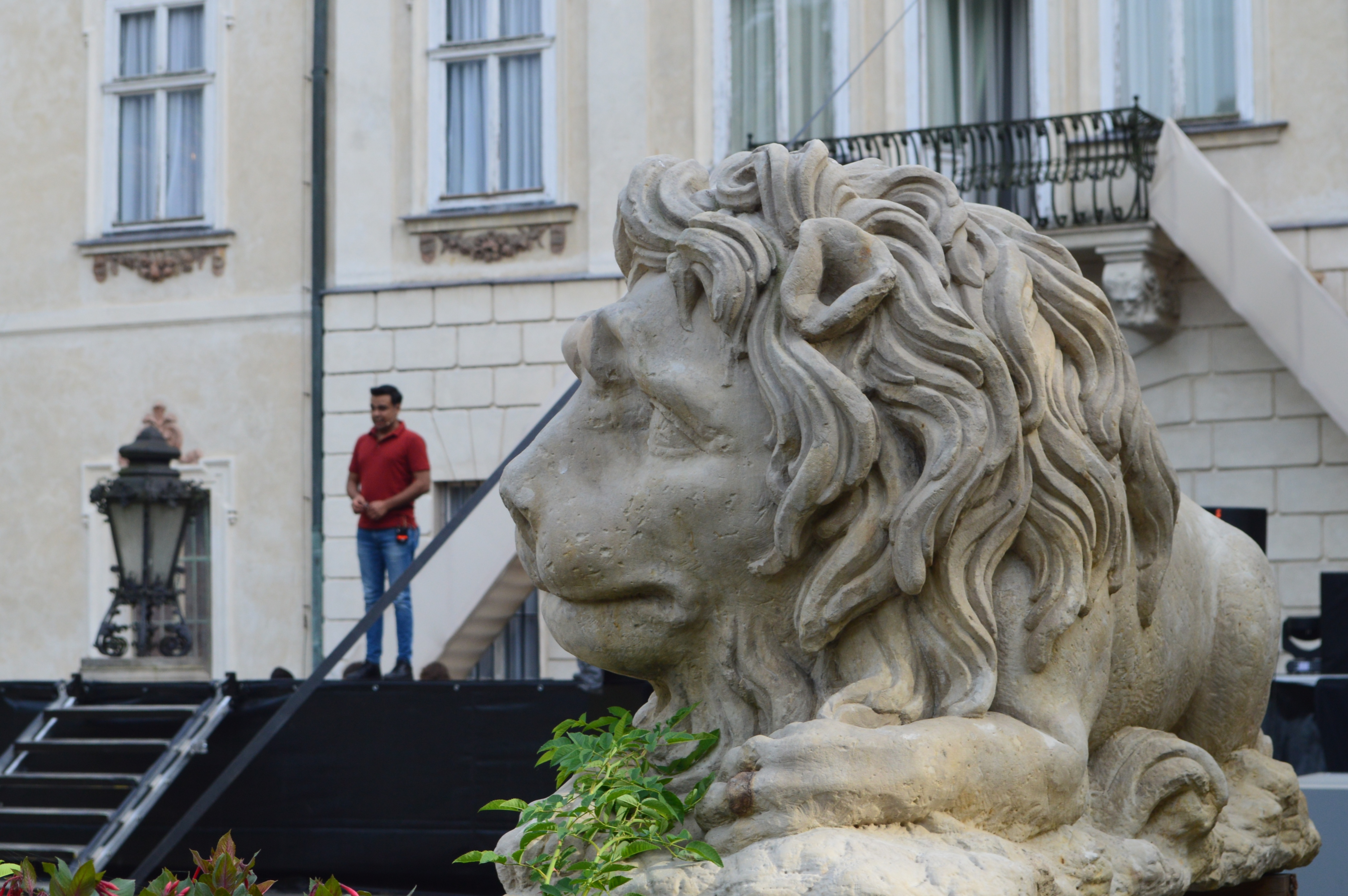
Sculpture of a lion in the park

Nieborów Estate is surrounded by an impressive park. It consists of two big parts: landscape park designed by Tylman van Gameren and rectangular, a French-style garden followed the model of the Versailles. Lime avenue runs from the Palace, through the centre of the garden leading to the so-called “aha” – a narrowing clearing at the end of the avenue which gives an impression that the park is longer than in reality. Rows of plants are on both sides of the avenue and next to the palace, there is the so-called “salon” – geometric flower beds.

The landscape park has a shape of an “L” letter. In its northern part there is a pond with a stream. A unique plant specimen grows here – Wolffia Arrhiza which is the smallest flowering plant in the world. In the park one can admire lapidariums and sculptures from different epochs. A special attention must be paid to: marble bas-relief named as “Porwanie Amfitryty przez Posejdona” (Kidnapping of Amphitrite by Poseidon), stone figures called “baby” (the women) which were transported to the park in 19th century from the Black Sea, and an ancient Roman gravestone built by Marek Wincjusz for Acilii Capitolinie. That surname was used by Henryk Sienkiewicz in Quo Vadis.

== The museum ==
The museum in Nieborów Estate currently displays the inside of 17th and 18th century which is largely based on furniture that has survived, and supplemented with collection of the National Museum in Warsaw. It also features a collection of Western European and Polish paintings, initiated by Michał Radziwiłł. His wife Helena collected numerous antiquities, ancient sculptures and architectural fragments, Etruscan vases, Roman sarcophagi, funeral urns and medieval artefacts, including the famous Polovtsian cult carvings known as the babas from the twelfth and thirteenth centuries. In 1987 the museum received an award – Złoty Medal Ministra Kultury i Sztuki (The Gold Medal of the Ministry of Culture and Art) for conservation and preservation of the garden and museum in Nieborów and Arkadia. In June 1994 the museum received Europejska Nagroda za Ochronę Zabydków (the European Award for Conservation of Monuments) founded by FVS in Hamburg. There is an entrance fee for an admission to the Nieborów Estate and the park in Arkadia.

For over 70 years, the Palace has served not only as a museum of popular interest, but also as a venue for international conferences and diplomatic meetings. Keeping the tradition that dates back to 1944, the Palace offered guest rooms to the most outstanding Polish authors and artists including such names as Andrzej Wajda, Władysław Tatarkiewicz, Aleksander Gieysztor, Maria Dąbrowska and Sławomir Mrożek. Other prominent visitors to the palace have included Queen Sophia of Spain, George H. W. Bush and Lee Radziwill.

== See also ==
- Architecture of Poland
- List of palaces in Poland

== Bibliography ==
- Stanisław Lorentz, Nieborów 1945–1970 – Księga pamiątkowa, Warszawa 1970
- Adam Miłobędzki, Architektura Polski XVII Wieku, Warszawa 1980
- Mossakowski S., Tylman z Gameren, Warszawa 2003
- Piwkowski W., Nieborów – Arkadia (przewodnik), Łódź 1989
- Piwkowski W., Nieborów. Mazowiecka rezydencja Radziwiłłów, Warszawa 2005
- Muzeum w Nieborowie i Arkadii [online 25.01.2015r] http://www.nieborow.art.pl
