= Karolew, Łowicz County =

Karolew
- Village
- Location within Poland
- Coordinates: 52°6′50″N 20°6′35″E
- Country: Poland
- Voivodeship: Łódź
- County: Łowicz
- Gmina: Nieborów

Karolew [kaˈrɔlɛf] is a village in the administrative district of Gmina Nieborów, within Łowicz County, Łódź Voivodeship, in central Poland.
