= Arkadia, Łowicz County =

Arkadia
- Village
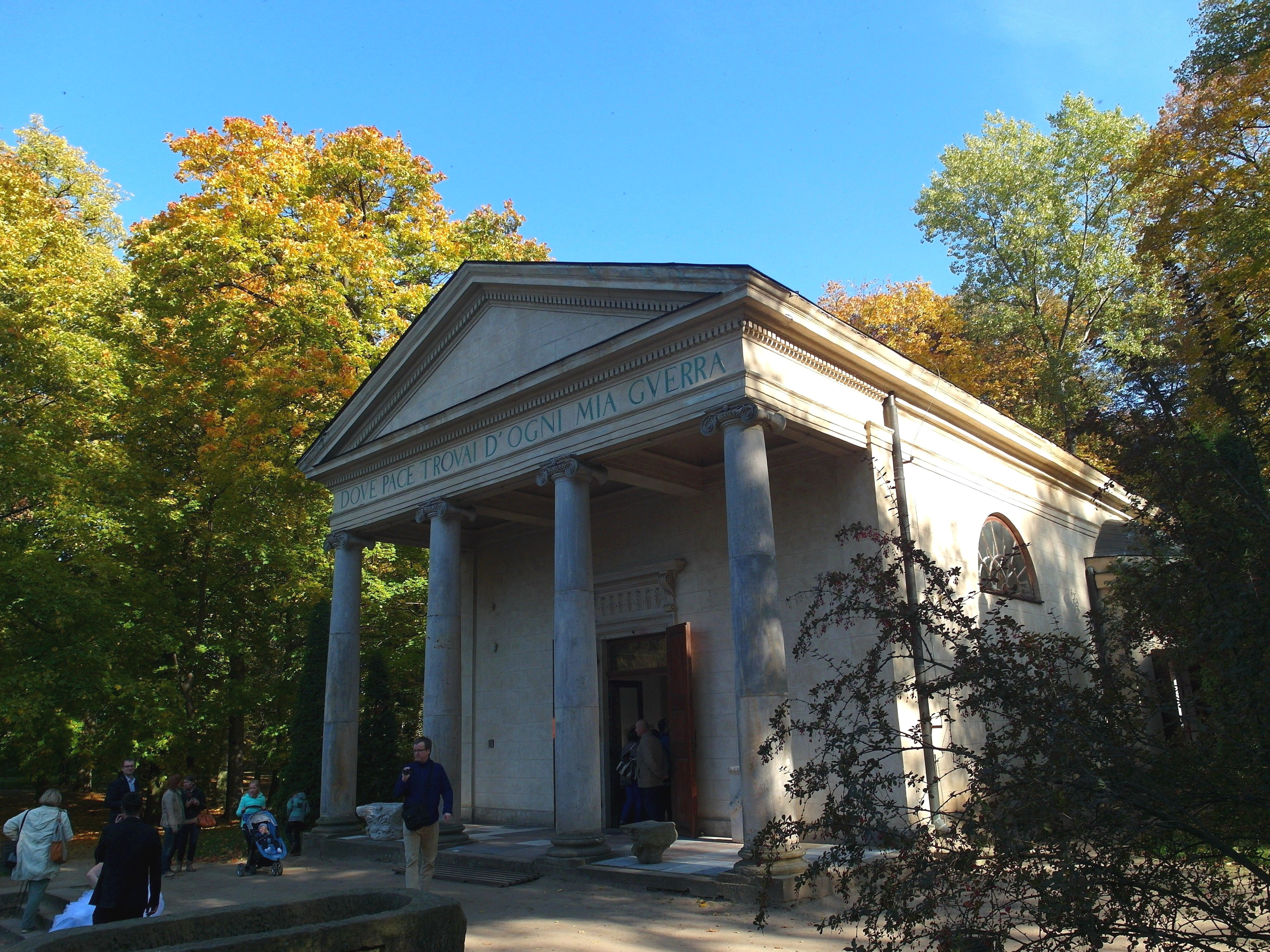
- Temple of Diana

- Location within Poland
- Coordinates: 52°4′53″N 20°0′28″E
- Country: Poland
- Voivodeship: Łódź
- County: Łowicz
- Gmina: Nieborów
- Population (approx.): 250

Arkadia (Polish pronunciation: [arˈkadja]) is a village in the administrative district of Gmina Nieborów, within Łowicz County, Łódź Voivodeship, in central Poland.

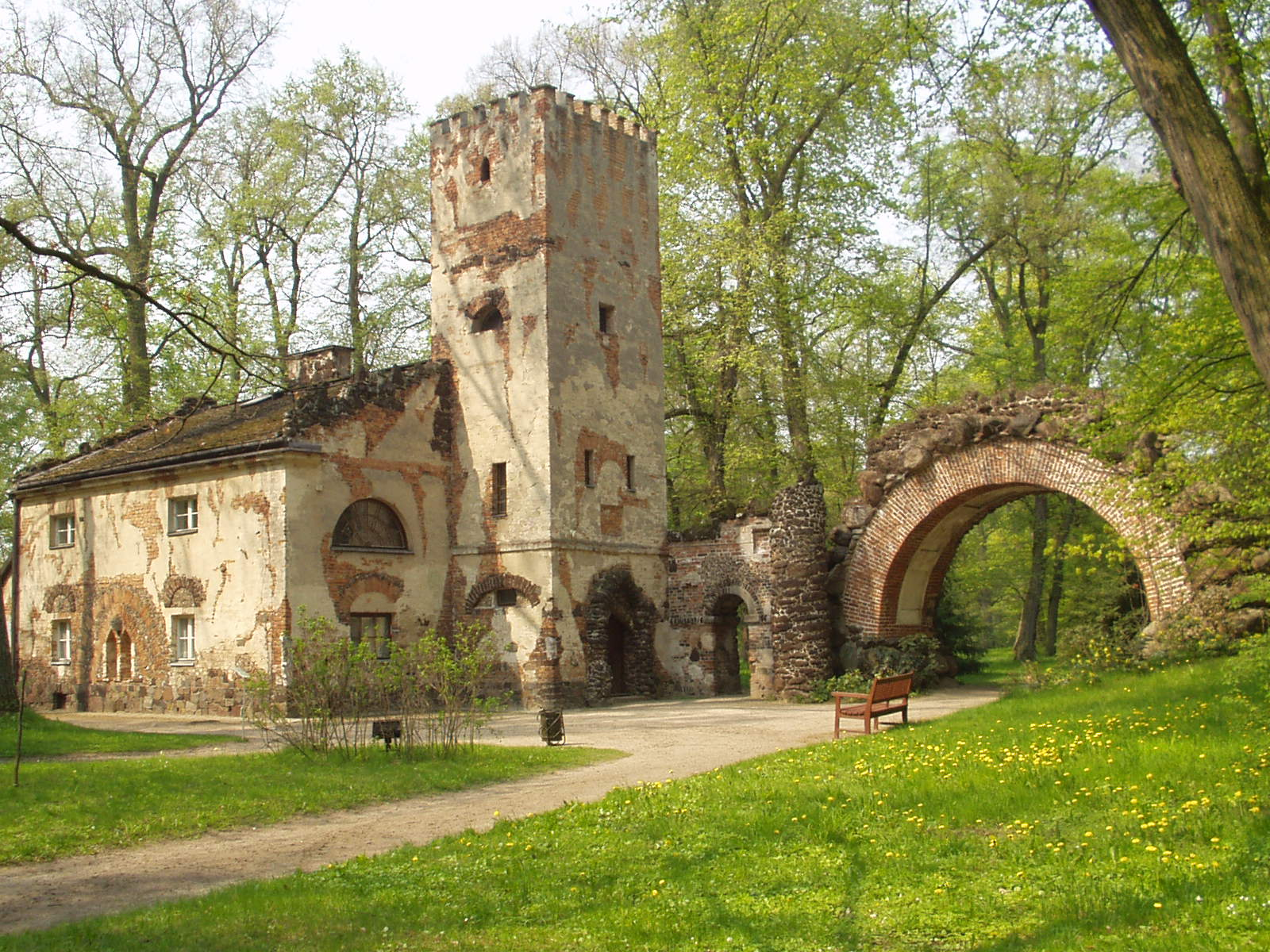
Margrave's House and Greek Arch in Arkadia

The village has an approximate population of 250. The village is famous for its English Garden Park set up by Helena Radziwiłł in 1779 with the designers Szymon Bogumil Zug and Henryk Ittar.
