= Nieborów =

- Village
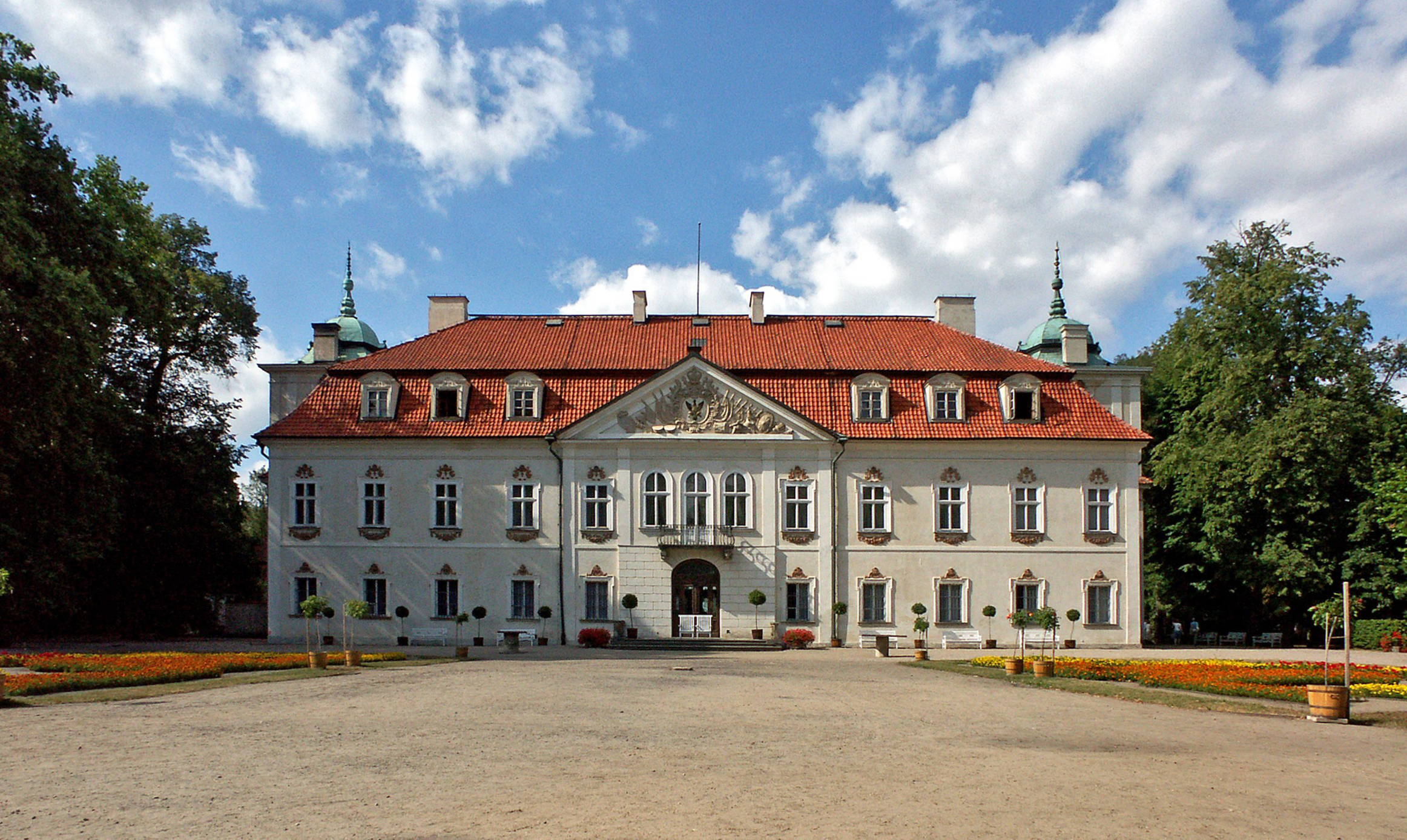
- Palace of Nieborów

- Location within Poland
- Coordinates: 52°8′N 20°7′E
- Country: Poland
- Voivodeship: Łódź
- County: Łowicz
- Gmina: Nieborów
- Population: 900

Nieborów [ɲɛˈbɔruf] is a village in Łowicz County, Łódź Voivodeship, in central Poland. It is the seat of the gmina (administrative district) called Gmina Nieborów.

The village is famous for the Arkadia park situated nearby and the Nieborów Palace and park. The palace is a former home of the Radziwill family.
