= Michał Radziwiłł =

Michał Radziwiłł may refer to:

- Michał Kazimierz Radziwiłł (1635-1680) - Deputy Chancellor of Lithuania, Field Lithuanian Hetman, voivode of Wilno
- Michał Kazimierz Radziwiłł Rybeńko (1702-1762) - Grand Lithuanian Hetman, voivode of Wilno
- Michał Hieronim Radziwiłł (1744-1831) - voivode of Wilno
- Michał Gedeon Radziwiłł (1778-1850) - general, Polish leader during the November Uprising
- Michał Radziwiłł Rudy (1870-1954) - Polish noble, prince
