= Stanisław Albrecht Radziwiłł =

Polish nobleman

Prince Stanisław Albrecht Radziwiłł
- Born: 21 July 1914; Szpanów Palace, Rovno, Volhynian Governorate, Russian Empire (now Rivne, Ukraine)
- Died: 27 July 1976 (aged 62); London, England
- Noble family: Radziwiłł; Lubomirski
- Spouses: Rose de Mauléon (m. 1940; ann. 1945) Grace Maria Kolin (m. 1946; div. 1958) Lee Bouvier Canfield (m. 1959; div. 1974)
- Issue: Prince John Stanisław; Prince Anthony Stanisław Albert; Princess Anna Krystyna
- Father: Prince Janusz Franciszek, Prince Radziwiłł
- Mother: Princess Anna Lubomirska

Prince Stanisław Albrecht "Stash" Radziwiłł (Polish: [raˈd͡ʑivʲiw]; 21 July 1914 – 27 July 1976) was a Polish prince, socialite and businessman who later became a British citizen. He served as director of Olympic Airways.

== Early life and education ==
Radziwiłł was born 21 July 1914 at Szpanów Palace, Russian Empire (now Rivne, Ukraine), the youngest of four children, to Janusz Franciszek, Prince Radziwiłł (1880–1967) and Princess Anna Lubomirska (1882–1947), into Polish nobility.

His paternal family, the House of Radziwiłł, were among the wealthiest noble families in Europe during the 15th and 16th century, however that wealth was largely diminished by the time Stanisław was born. He had two elder brothers, Prince Edmund Radziwiłł (1906–1971) and Prince Ludwik Radziwiłł (1911–1928).

He was raised between Poland and Western Europe until the family was officially displaced. He attended high school in Pszczyna and in 1937 studied at the University of Fribourg in Switzerland. In 1939, aged 25, Stanisław came to Switzerland permanently as a refugee, initially unable to secure accommodation, he was forced to stay at soup kitchens.

== Career ==
During his time in Switzerland, he ultimately became a chargé d'affaires of the Polish government in exile at the League of Nations as well as humanitarian delegate of the Polish Red Cross.

In the late 1950s and 1960s, Radziwiłł relocated his family to London, England, where he was active in commercial real estate development in Central London. His dealings in real estate are the primary source of his later wealth. Through family and business associate Aristotle Onassis, Radziwiłł later served as director of Olympic Airways.

Radziwiłł was one of the organisers of the Sikorski Historical Institute in London and founder of St. Anne's Church at Fawley Court, the site of Divine Mercy College, a school for boys of Polish origin, set up by the Marian Fathers in 1953 near Henley-on-Thames, England.

== Marriages ==
Radziwiłł married Rose de Mauléon (1913–1996), on 10 April 1940, former niece-in-law of Irina Ovtchinnikova, wife of Prince Peter of Greece and Denmark. They had no children and their marriage was annulled in 1945. She later married Baron de Chollet, a Swiss banker.

Radziwill married Grace Maria Kolin on 2 May 1946. They were divorced in 1958. The marriage produced one son:

- John Stanisław Radziwill (8 August 1947), who married Eugenia Carras, daughter of the Greek shipowner Yiannis Carras, on 14 September 1978. They have two sons and four grandchildren:
  - John Michael Radziwill (29 August 1979)
  - Philip Radziwill (4 February 1981), who married Devon Schuster on 16 January 2010. They have four children:
    - Eugenie Elizabeth Radziwill (24 October 2012)
    - Isabella Sophia Radziwill (17 July 2014)
    - Arietta Grace Radziwill (17 July 2014)
    - Stanisław Radziwill (2018)

Grace Maria Kolin later married William Ward, 3rd Earl of Dudley (1894–1969) as his third wife, and from 1975, she lived with Robert B. Silvers.

On 19 March 1959, Radziwiłł married Caroline Lee Bouvier Canfield the younger sister of future First Lady Jacqueline Kennedy and sister-in-law of future President John F. Kennedy. They had two children:

- Anthony Radziwiłł (4 August 1959 – 10 August 1999), who married Carole Ann DiFalco on 27 August 1994.
- Anna Christina "Tina" Radziwill (18 August 1960), who married Octavio Arancio in September 1999; they were divorced in 2005

In 1966, they purchased Turville Grange in Buckinghamshire, for £55,000 (approximately £1,330,000 in modern equivalency) as a family country home. It was sold after the divorce in 1974 to Henry Ford II.

He died on 27 July 1976, in London, six days after his 62nd birthday. His body was interred in the crypt of St Anne's Church at Fawley Court.

== Title ==
According to Debrett's, although known as Prince Radziwiłł in Britain, on becoming a British subject and in keeping with standard practice, Radziwiłł strictly needed permission from Queen Elizabeth II to use his princely title. The Radziwiłł family held the title Prince of the Holy Roman Empire since the early 16th century. However, noble titles were abolished in Poland and Austria.

== Ancestry ==
Ancestors of Stanisław Albrecht Radziwiłł

8. Prince Bogusław Fryderyk Radziwiłł
4. Prince Ferdynand Radziwiłł
9. Countess Léontine of Clary and Aldringen
2. Prince Janusz Radziwiłł
10. Prince Léon Sapieha-Kodenski
5. Princess Pelagia Sapieha-Kodenska
11. Countess Johanna Tyszkiewicz
1. Stanisław Albrecht Radziwiłł
12. Prince Kasimir Lubomirski
6. Prince Stanislaw Lubomirski
13. Zénaide Holynska
3. Princess Anna Jadwiga Maria Lubomirska
14. Adam, Prince Lubomirski
7. Princess Wanda Lubomirska
15. Princess Karoline Ponińska

== See also ==
- Sikorski Museum
