= Radziwiłł family =

Polish–Lithuanian noble family

Radziwiłł
- Princely arms of the Radziwiłł family, incorporating the Trąby emblem
- Origin: Kernavė, Grand Duchy of Lithuania
- Founded: 15th century
- Founder: Radvila Astikas
- Connected families: Astikai family Bouvier family Danish Royal Family; Greek Royal Family; Rzewuski family Jagiellonian dynasty House of Hohenzollern; House of Wittelsbach; House of Krasinski; House of Habsburg-Lorraine; House of Castellane; House of Clary und Aldringen; House of Sayn-Wittgenstein-Berleburg; House of Wettin; House of Urach

The House of Radziwiłł (Polish pronunciation: [raˈd͡ʑiviww]; Lithuanian: Radvila; Belarusian: Радзівіл, romanized: Radzivił; German: Radziwill) is a Polish princely family of Lithuanian origin, and one of the most powerful magnate families originating from the Grand Duchy of Lithuania and later also prominent in the Crown of the Kingdom of Poland. Part of the representatives of the Radziwiłł family were known for their persistent and consistent struggle for the independence of the Grand Duchy of Lithuania and for their crucial role in preserving the Grand Duchy of Lithuania as a separate state in the 16th and 17th centuries.

The family was founded by Radvila Astikas, but over time it split into many branches, such as the Biržai-Dubingiai and Goniądz-Meteliai lines. However, most of the branches became extinct by the 18th century, with only the Nesvizh-Kleck-Ołyka line surviving to this day. Their descendants were highly prominent for centuries, first in the Grand Duchy of Lithuania, later in the Polish–Lithuanian Commonwealth and the Kingdom of Prussia. The family produced many individuals notable in Lithuanian, Polish, Belarusian, German as well as general European history and culture. Many members of the Radziwiłł family served in high-ranking officers positions of the Grand Duchy of Lithuania (e.g. 13 were Voivodes of Vilnius, the capital city, 10 were Castellans of Vilnius, seven were Grand Chancellors of Lithuania, nine were Grand Marshals of Lithuania, seven were Grand Hetmans of Lithuania, etc.). The Radziwiłł family received the title of Reichsfürst (prince) from the Holy Roman Emperor in the early 16th-century and were the first nobles in Lithuania and Poland who received this title.

The last patrilineal member of the Radziwiłł family who lived in Lithuania was Konstantinas Radvila, an owner of the Taujėnai Manor, however after the Soviet occupation of Lithuania in 1940 he was arrested by the NKVD and deported from Lithuania to the Uzbek SSR in 1941 where he died in ~1945.

The Nesvizh Castle complex, maintained by the family between the 16th century and 1939, is a UNESCO World Heritage site.

== Name and origin ==
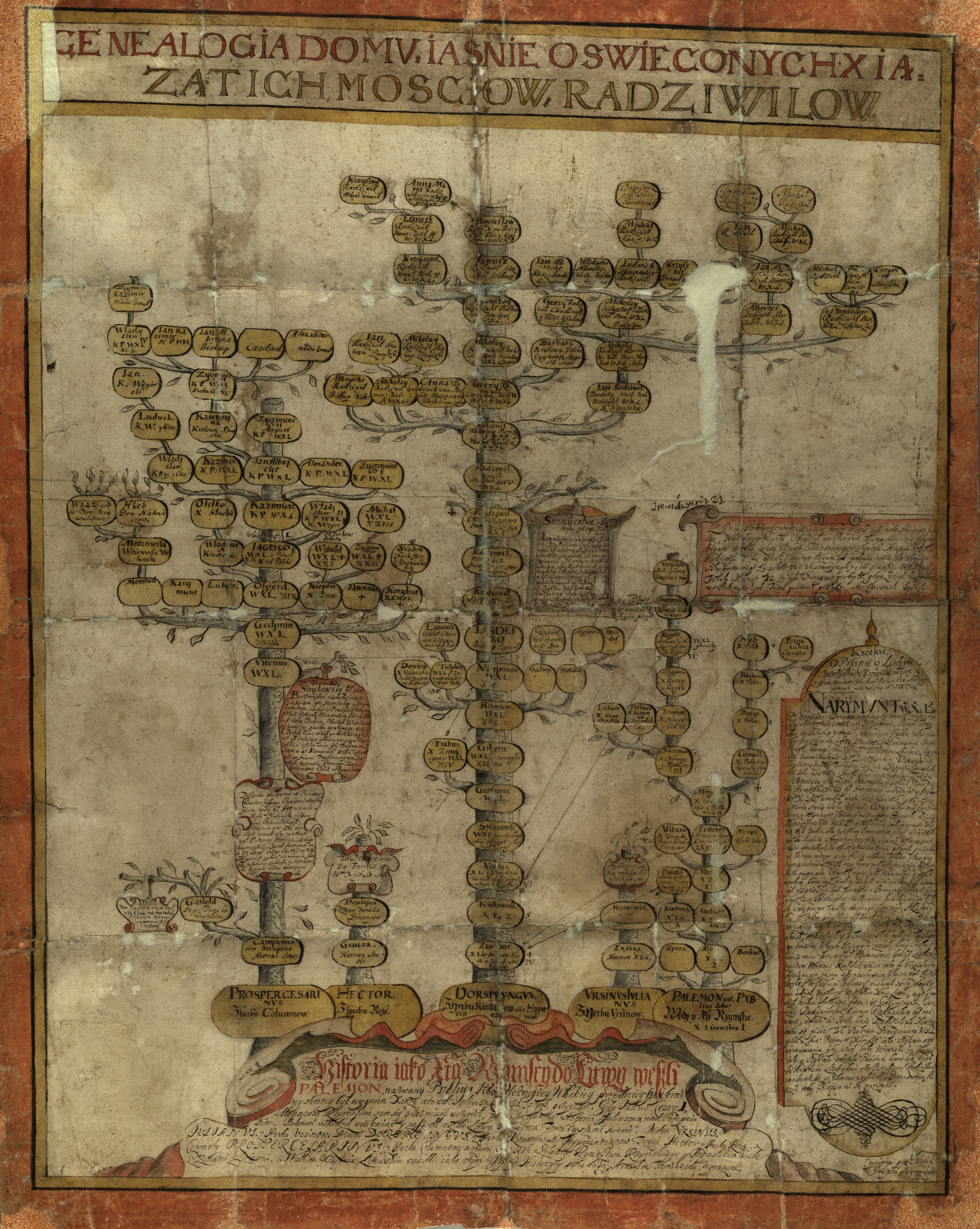
Radziwiłł family tree

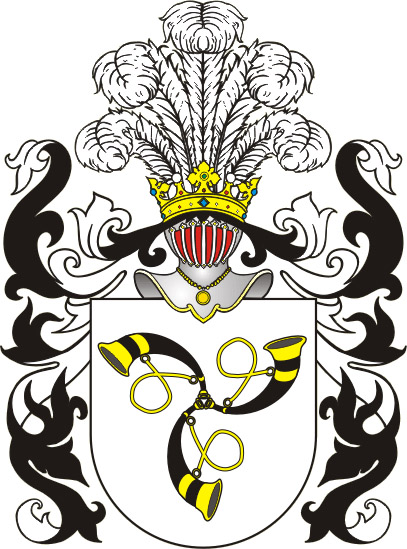
Trąby coat of arms,a variation of was granted to Kristinas Astikas' family in 1413

The Radziwiłł family is a directly descended branch of the extinct Lithuanian noble Astikai family line. Its first notable member, Kristinas Astikas (born 1363), a close associate of the Lithuanian ruler Vytautas, became Castellan of Vilnius. The patronym Radvila arose following its use by his son Radvila Astikas and grandson Mikalojus Radvila the Old. A legendary version of the patronym's etymology associates it with a child found by krivis Lizdeika in a wolf's den (rado vilko... = "found wolf's...", implying "rado vilko vaikas" = "found wolf's child"). The Polish forms Radziwiłł or Radźwił (patronymics Radziwiłłowic(z), Radźwiłowic(z)) may come from the originally Belarusian Radzivil, i.e. a derivative of il from the base Radziv-, derived from a shortened form of the name Radzivón (with a v removing the hiatus from the church Rodi.ón, similarly to Larivón from Lari.ón (Ilarión) or Ljavónt from (Le.ón), and similarly to Stanil from Stanislav. They would have been adopted into Lithuanian as Radzivìlas, Radzvilà.

The family descends from Lithuanian bajorai-ducal courtiers who advanced considerably in the 15th-century politics of the Grand Duchy of Lithuania. Along with possessions of land near Kernavė, the family's traced place of origin, the Radziwiłł family also was granted a variation of the Trąby coat of arms.

Three of the sons of Mikalojus Radvila the Old, Mikołaj, Jan, and Jerzy, went on to become the progenitors of the three known Radziwiłł family lines. His daughter Anna was the great-grandmother of Elizabeth Báthory.

The Radziwiłł family divided by branch:

- the Goniądz - Meteliai line
- the Biržai - Dubingiai line
- the Nieśwież (Nesvizh) – Kleck (Kletsk) – Ołyka line

The Goniądz-Meteliai line became extinct by the next generation as Mikołaj's descendants consisted of one male heir, Mikołaj III, who entered the priesthood and became the Bishop of Samogitia, thus bearing no known offspring to extend the line.

The Biržai-Dubingiai line was moderately more successful and produced some very notable state officials and politicians, but it also became extinct after Ludwika Karolina Radziwiłł's death in 1695.

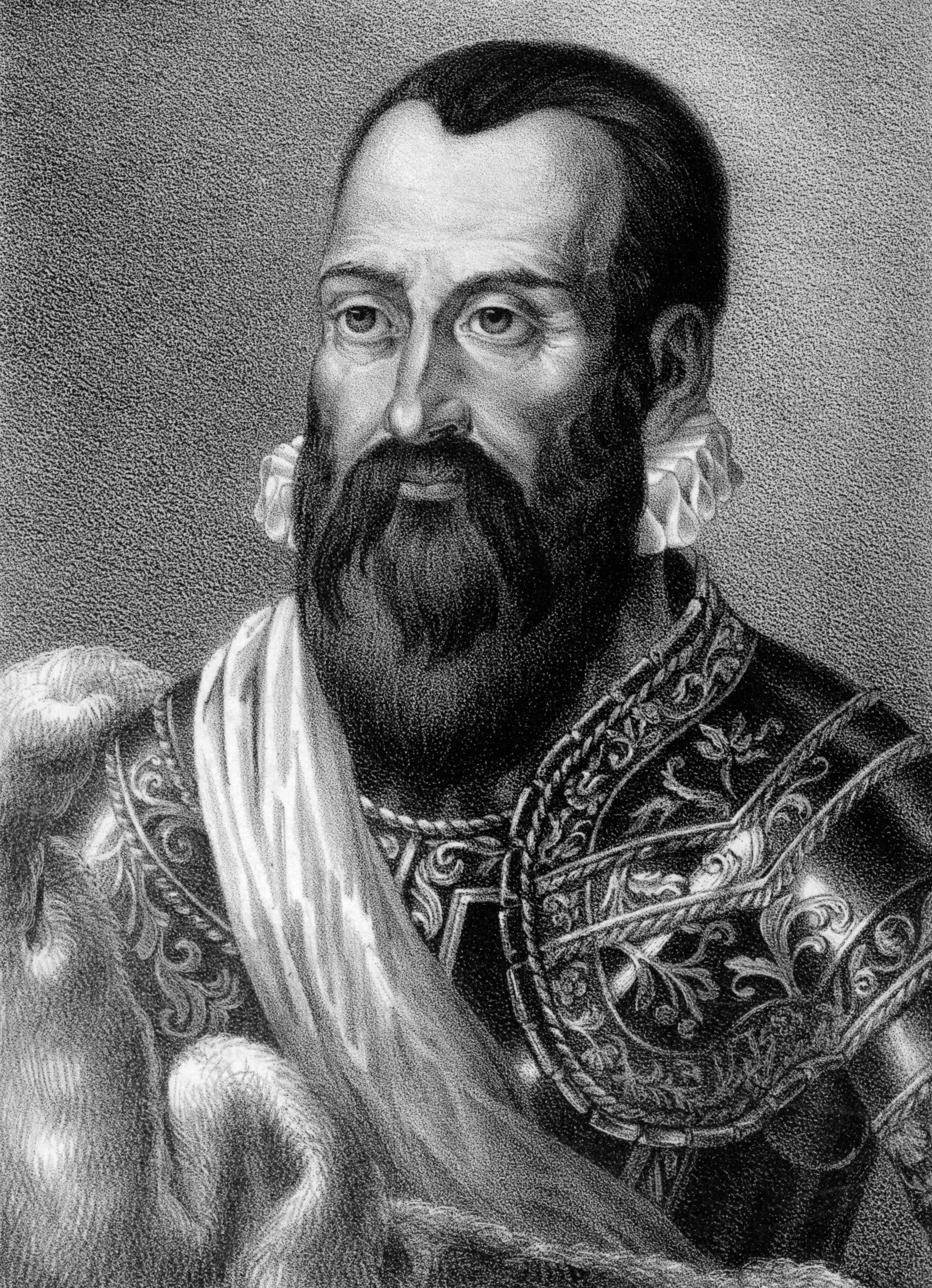
Mikołaj "the Black" Radziwiłł (1515–1565), perhaps the most influential member of the family. He rallied opposition to the Lublin Union between Lithuania and Poland.

The Nesvizh-Kletsk-Olyka line was the most successful and was further divided into smaller family lines to maintain clarity and specificity of descent and the passing of titles. Since the 18th century, all Radziwiłł family members have been descendants of this line. Three sons of Mikołaj "the Black", Mikołaj Krzysztof "the Orphan", Albrycht, and Stanisław "the Pious", are said to be the progenitors of the three smaller branches. The branches are as follows:

- the Nesvizh line
- the older Kletsk line
- the Olyka line

Possibly both the Olyka and older Kletsk lines became extinct, the former in 1656 and the latter in 1690. The direct descendant of the Nesvizh line, Dominik Hieronim's son, Aleksander Dominik, was born before his parents' marriage and formed the so-called Galician branch, which went extinct in 1938.

The younger Kletsk line descends from Michał Hieronim, continued through his son Ludwik Mikolaj. The descendants of his other son, Antoni Henryk, formed the beginning of the so-called Ordynant branch. Other than the Ordynant branch, from the younger Kletsk line also descends the lesser titled branches of Szydłowiec and Połoneczka, as well as Dziatłava, Berdychiv, and Żyrmunów. The younger Kletsk line has continued into the present day.

- the Nesvizh line
  - the Galician line
- the younger Kletsk line
  - the Ordynant line
  - the Szydłowiec-Połoneczka line
  - the Dziatłava-Berdychiv-Żyrmunów line

== Coat of arms and motto ==
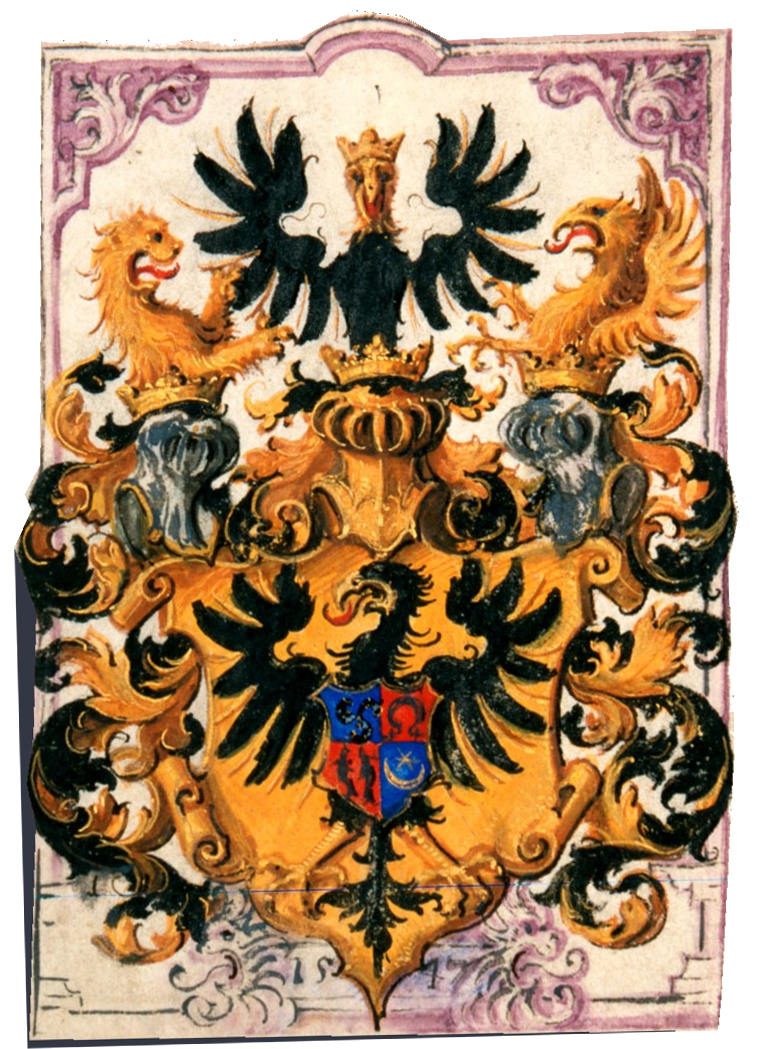
The coat of arms as granted in 1547 by the Holy Roman Emperor.

Kristinas Astikas, ancestor of the Radziwiłł family, was among these who were granted and adopted the emblem known as Trąby after the Union of Horodło in 1413. This emblem later became the hereditary coat of arms of the Radziwiłłs.

In 1518, Holy Roman Emperor Maximilian I created Mikalojus Radvila's son, Mikołaj, Reichsfürst ("Imperial Prince") of Goniądz and Meteliai after the Jagiellonian-Habsburg congress at Vienna. Mikołaj Radziwiłł also received an expanded, more solemn coat of arms: as princes of the Holy Roman Empire, the Radziwiłłs bore a black eagle, on whose breast is a shield with Trąby and other emblems. The family motto is "God advises us" (Polish: Bóg nam radzi, Belarusian: Бог нам раіць, Boh nam rajić).

In 1547, Charles V, Holy Roman Emperor, created Mikołaj "the Black" and his brother, Jan, hereditary Reichsfürsten of Nesvizh and Olyka; their cousin Mikołaj "the Red" Radziwiłł was created Reichsfürst of Biržai and Dubingiai. The same year King Sigismund II Augustus of Poland married Barbara Radziwiłł and confirmed these titles in 1549. So high a title was rare among the szlachta (the Polish nobility): just five Polish families, including the Radziwiłłs, received the title of imperial prince from the Holy Roman emperor.

== Religion ==
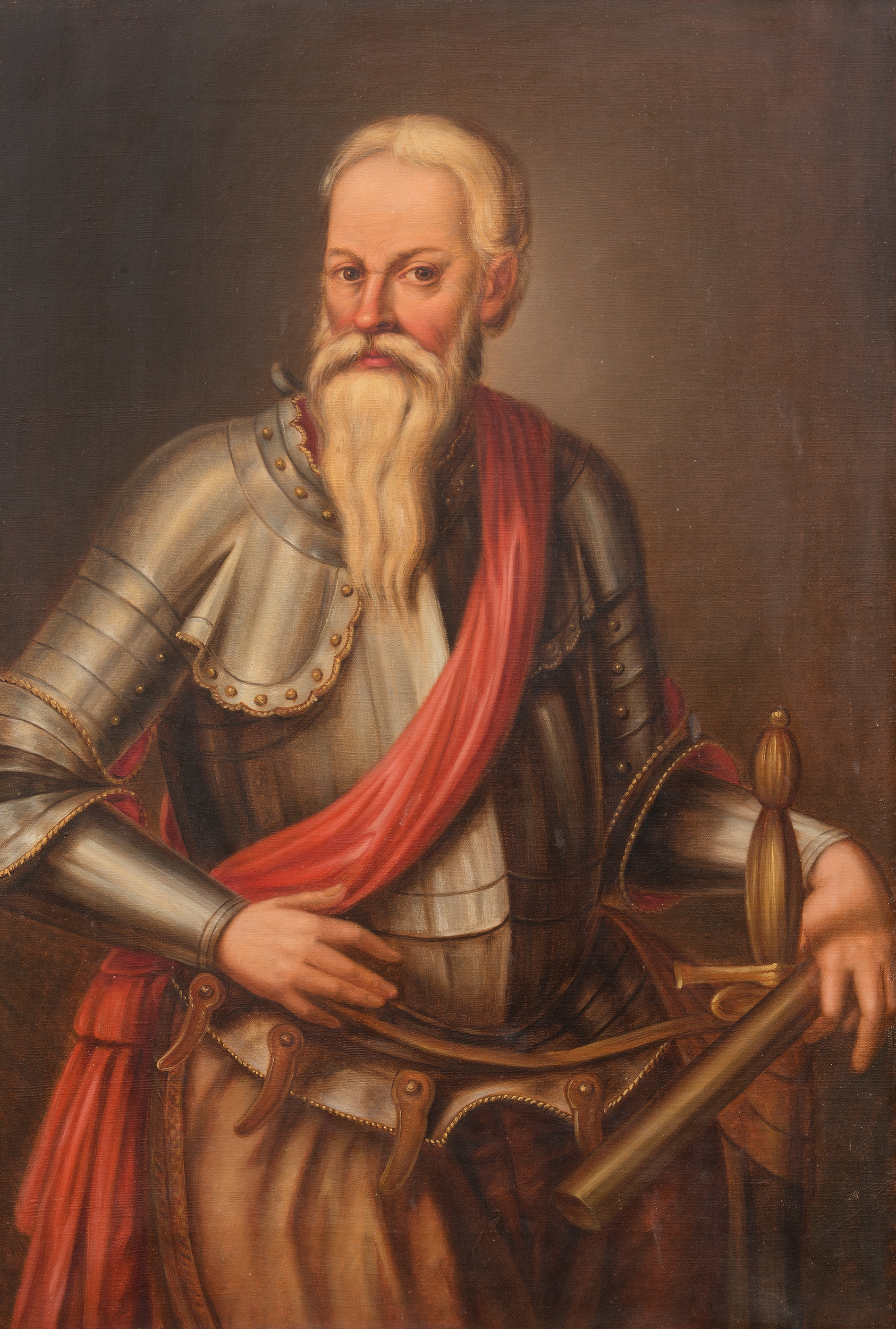
Mikołaj "the Red" Radziwiłł (1512–1584)

The Radziwiłł family also divided on religious grounds. Following the Protestant and Polish Reformation, two branches converted to Calvinism. Some members of the Nesvizh–Kletsk-Olyka branch of family remained as Calvinists for two generations until the children of Mikołaj "the Black" converted to Roman Catholicism before the end of the century. The Biržai-Dubingiai line remained in the Protestant faith until the extinction of their line one century later.

Queen Barbara Radziwiłł, sister of Mikołaj "the Red" and first cousin of Mikołaj "the Black", was a practicing Catholic and hence, despite controversy surrounding her secret wedding with the King, she was recognized by popes Paul III and Julius III as the legitimate royal wife and Queen of Poland. Nevertheless, Barbara apparently was tolerant towards different nominations, as she is not known to be conflicted with her brother or non-catholic members of her royal court because of their religious nomination.

Both Mikołaj "the Black" and Mikołaj "the Red" were zealous promoters and active participants of the Protestant religion within the GDL. Mikołaj "the Black" funded the printing of a second version, and first completed, Polish translation of a Protestant Bible, titled the "Radziwiłł Bible" (also known as "Biblia Brzeska"), which was published in the town of Brest in 1564. His death in 1565 was seen as a severe loss to the Protestant cause in Lithuania. However, Mikołaj "the Red" continued his cousin's work by founding and endowing land to several churches and schools.

== Politics ==
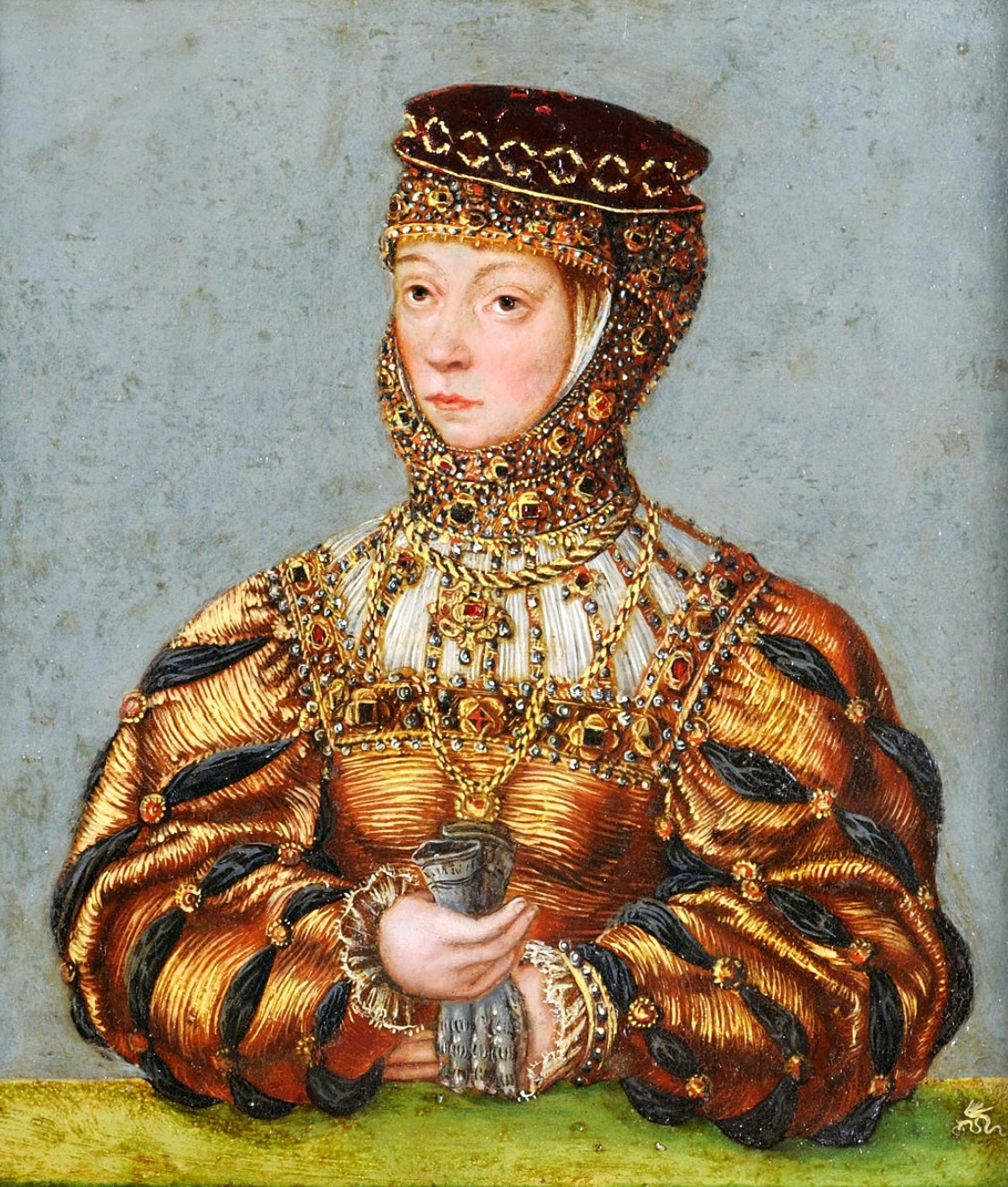
Barbara Radziwiłł (1520/23–1551), queen consort of Poland (1548–1551).

Several prominent family members have been involved in the domestic and foreign political arenas. They took an active part in the political life of the Grand Duchy of Lithuania. Its importance is manifested by family relations with such famous nobility dynasties in Belarus, Ukraine, Poland, the Great Duchy of Lithuania, Samogitia, and Rus like Zaslawski, Rohatinski, Lukomski, and Olshanski-Dobrowicki. The Radziwiłł family joined the rest of the nobility as the state's elite after the signing of the Union of Krewo in 1385.

The significance of the Radziwiłł family is proved by the marriage of Anna to Konrad III Rudy, duke of Masovia, who owned the largest Polish principality.

In 1547 Barbara Radziwiłł was married in secret to Sigismund II Augustus, thus legally becoming royal consort; she was officially proclaimed Queen of Poland and Grand Duchess of Lithuania the next year. Although the marriage caused scandal within the country as it was performed without informing Polish nobles, the royal couple was supported by the Papal Curia, as well by the Radziwiłł family's ally and the King's former father-in-law, Ferdinand Habsburg. Barbara was crowned in 1550. Some Polish nobles opposed the idea of Sigismund and Barbara's child inheriting the Polish throne in the future, because of disdain towards the Radziwiłł's family further elevation, however Barbara presumably miscarried twice during her marriage with the King, and died in 1551 without having surviving children.

Later the Radziwiłłs established family relations not only with the most important families of the Polish, Belarusian and Lithuanian magnate families like Sanguszko, Sapieha or Chodkiewicz, but also with members of royal families like Wiśniowiecki, Sobieski, and Leszczyński.

The political position of the Radziwiłłs was enhanced in the 16th century. In 1515, Mikołaj, as a member of a delegation, headed by King Sigismund I the Old took part in the First Congress of Vienna in Pressburg and Vienna where Emperor Maximilian I met the kings of Poland, Hungary and Bohemia. Additionally, Mikolaj "the Black" was the deputy to the Grand Prince when the latter was abroad. From that time on, the Radziwiłłs were also granted the privilege of keeping legal acts and other state documents in Nesvizh.

In 1583 bishop Jerzy Radziwiłł was elevated to the cardinalate by Pope Gregory XIII, established a closer relationship with the influential noble banking families Altoviti and Strozzi. Later prince Aleksander Ludwik Radziwiłł married Lucrezia Maria Strozzi, great-granddaughter of Bindo Altoviti and Filippo Strozzi.

During this time until the first half of the 17th century, the Radziwiłłs were the most influential and richest family among the magnate dynasties of the Grand Duchy of Lithuania. This status enabled them, along with very few other families, to have their own army. In 1528, the Radziwiłłs owned 18,240 houses, thus being able to have cavalry of 760 horsemen. In 1567, 28,170 houses provided for an expanded 939 horsemen and 1586 infantrymen. In the 18th century, the army of Hieronim Florian, for instance, had 6,000 men and was equal to the entire armed forces of the Grand Duchy of Lithuania.

Members of the Radziwiłł family held important state posts in the Rzeczpospolita and in the Grand Duchy of Lithuania. 8 chancellors, 7 hetmans, 15 castellans, 19 marszałeks, and 19 voivodes, almost exclusively representing the Grand Duchy of Lithuania, rather than the Crown, belonged to the dynasty. Radziwiłłs were members of the parliament and of the Tribunal of the Grand Duchy of Lithuania. They also held high military posts and took part in the Livonian War, Russo-Polish War of 1647–1667, Northern Wars, participated in the Napoleonic campaign, and the Kościuszko Uprising. Part of the representatives of the Radziwiłł family were known for their persistent and consistent struggle for the independence of the Grand Duchy of Lithuania and represented the Grand Duke of Lithuania when he was absent from the Grand Duchy of Lithuania. According to duke Maciej Radziwiłł, the Radziwiłł family's role was crucial in preserving the Grand Duchy of Lithuania as a separate state in the 16th and 17th centuries. Contemporaries of the 16th century were saying about the Radziwiłł family that "Lithuania is recognized by this name".

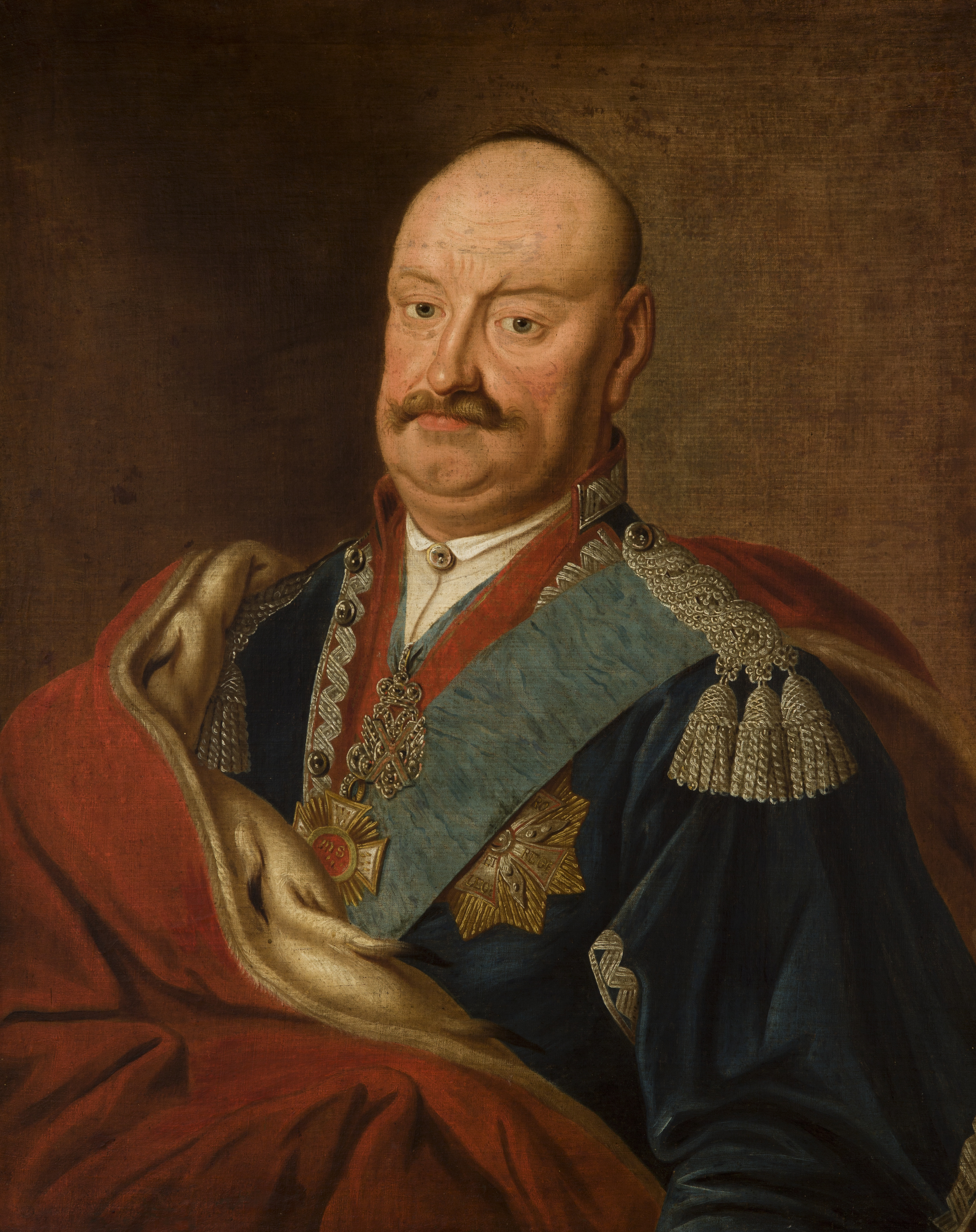
Karol Stanisław Radziwiłł (1734–1790), a representative of Sarmatism

The Radziwiłłs also gained international importance manifested in family relations with German princely dynasties, first established by Albrecht Radziwiłł from Olyka, who married Anna, princess of Courland. Such conjugal unions continued in the 17th and 18th centuries.

Karol Stanisław Radziwiłł (1734–1790) of the Nieśwież line was the wealthiest magnate in Poland, in the second half of the 18th century, and one of the richest men in Europe. As a patriot, he fought for a free nation that soon after his death would be partitioned between Austria, Prussia and the Russian Empire. During the Great Sejm from 1788 until he died in 1790, he was a leading opponent of reform and King Stanisław II Augustus and his allies, the members of the so-called Familia political party headed by the Czartoryski family.

After the three partitions of the Polish–Lithuanian Commonwealth in the late 18th century, towns and estates owned by the Radziwiłłs became parts of territories that belonged to Russia, Prussia and Austria. However, all three states recognized the title of princes of the Radziwiłł dynasty and the rights of its members at the family properties. In addition, many members of the Radziwiłł family held high civil and military posts.

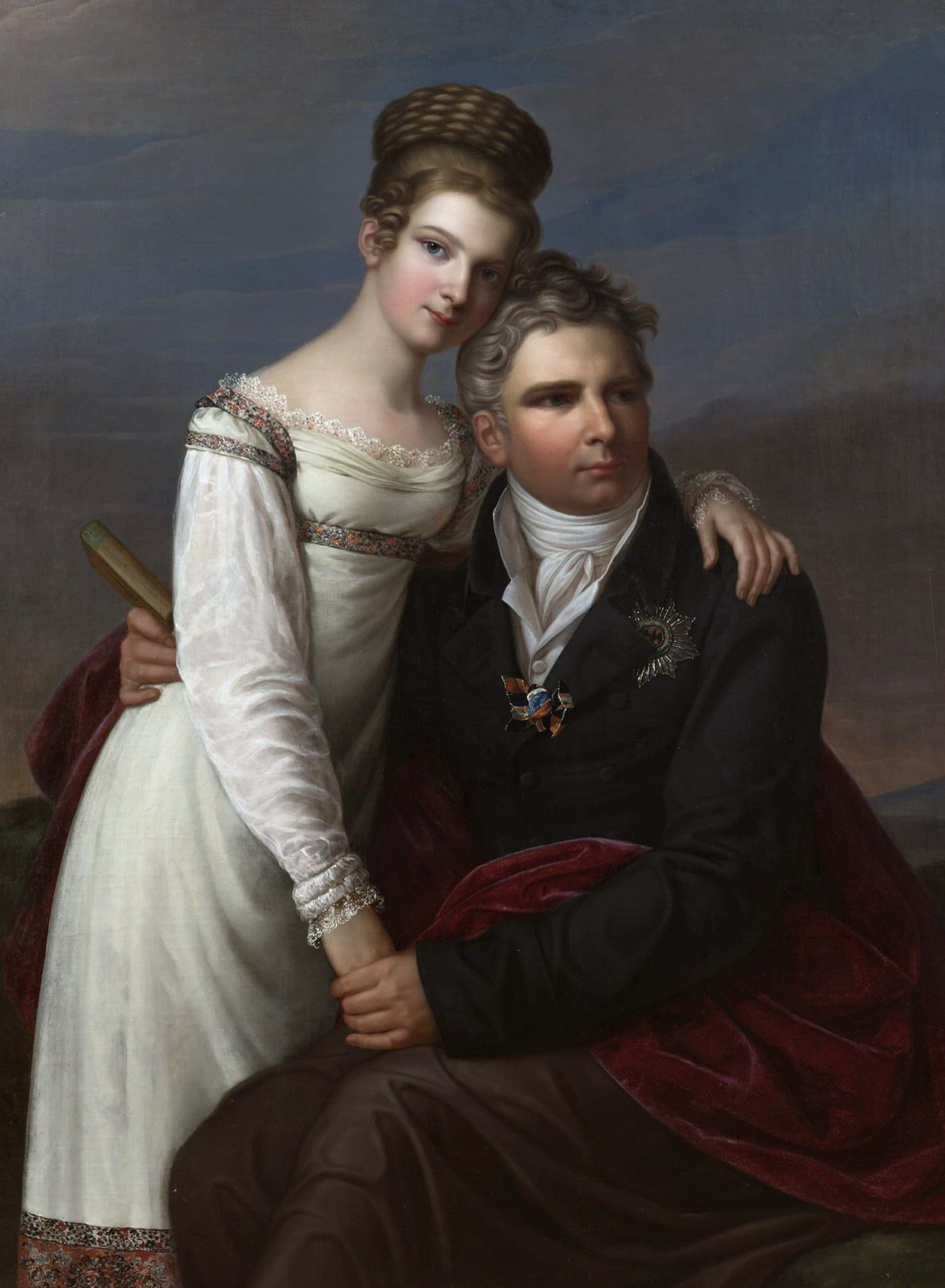
Antoni Radziwiłł and his daughter Elisa (1820)

They had family ties with the Dukes of Castellane, the Clary-Aldringen and Sayn-Wittgenstein princes and most importantly with Frederick William II, King of Prussia and his son Frederick William III. Prince Antoni Radziwiłł of the Kletsk line married Princess Louise of Prussia, a daughter of Prince Augustus Ferdinand of Prussia and hence a first cousin of King Frederick William II. This relation helped Antoni to release the vast properties of Nieśwież and Olyka from Russian seizure in 1815, after his cousin, Dominik of the Nieśwież line had fought and died on Napoleons' side in the Polish Legion, and Alexander I of Russia had therefore confiscated his whole property. After the Congress of Vienna, the inheritance was partially given to Antoni.

The couple were prominent patrons of the arts in Berlin during the early 19th century. At their Berlin residence, the Radziwiłł Palace, they hosted well-known personalities, artists and academics, playing a major role in promoting the Prussian-Polish relationship in Berlin. These included Polish politicians in the Prussian Parliament or such famous people as Johann Wolfgang von Goethe, Frédéric Chopin, Wilhelm and Alexander von Humboldt, Felix Mendelssohn Bartholdy and Karl Friedrich Schinkel. In fact, the "Salons" held by the Radziwiłłs were so popular that they became a symbol of "Polish Berlin". Prince Ferdynand Radziwiłł - like Wilhelm von Humboldt, Goethe, Felix Mendelssohn Bartholdy and many further notable personalities - also was a member of the Sing-Akademie zu Berlin where people from all walks of life and classes in Berlin came together to study and practice choral music. Although most of their largest estates were located in Russian Poland, the close relation with the Royal House of Prussia caused the family to preferably live at the Berlin court, using their influence, than in Warsaw or St. Petersburg, given their experience with the Czar's seizure of most of the family's property in 1813. Moreover, Michał Gedeon Radziwiłł was the commander-in-chief of the November uprising of 1830–31.

Elisa Radziwill, a daughter of Antoni and Louise, became the first love of the later Prussian King and German Emperor Wilhelm I. Her brothers Wilhelm (1797–1870) and Bogusław (1809–1873) became Prussian generals and politicians, the latter being an influential opponent of Prussian minister-president (and, from 1871, German Chancellor) Otto von Bismarck in his anti-Catholic politics, later called the Kulturkampf. Bogusław's son Ferdynand (1834–1926) also became an important leader of the Polish minority and opponent of the Germanization and Kulturkampf policies. After Poland regained independence in 1918, he became a Polish citizen and a member of the Polish parliament (Sejm), and so did his son Janusz (1880–1967). Their cousin Stanislaw Radziwiłł was the aide-de-camp to the Commander-in-chief Józef Piłsudski. In German-occupied Poland, Janusz tried to use his prestige to improve Nazi treatment of the Poles – unlike his brother Michał who sided with the Nazis, at least at the beginning of the occupation. After the Second World War in 1945, Janusz was arrested by NKVD, and his wife would die in a communist prison in 1947. Janusz died in his two-room apartment in Warsaw, with all of his possessions confiscated and nationalized by the communist government.

In 1959, Janusz's third son prince Stanisław Albrecht Radziwiłł married Caroline Bouvier, the younger sister of First Lady Jacqueline Kennedy.

== Art patronage ==
Chopin at Palais Radziwill in Berlin (Henryk Siemiradzki)

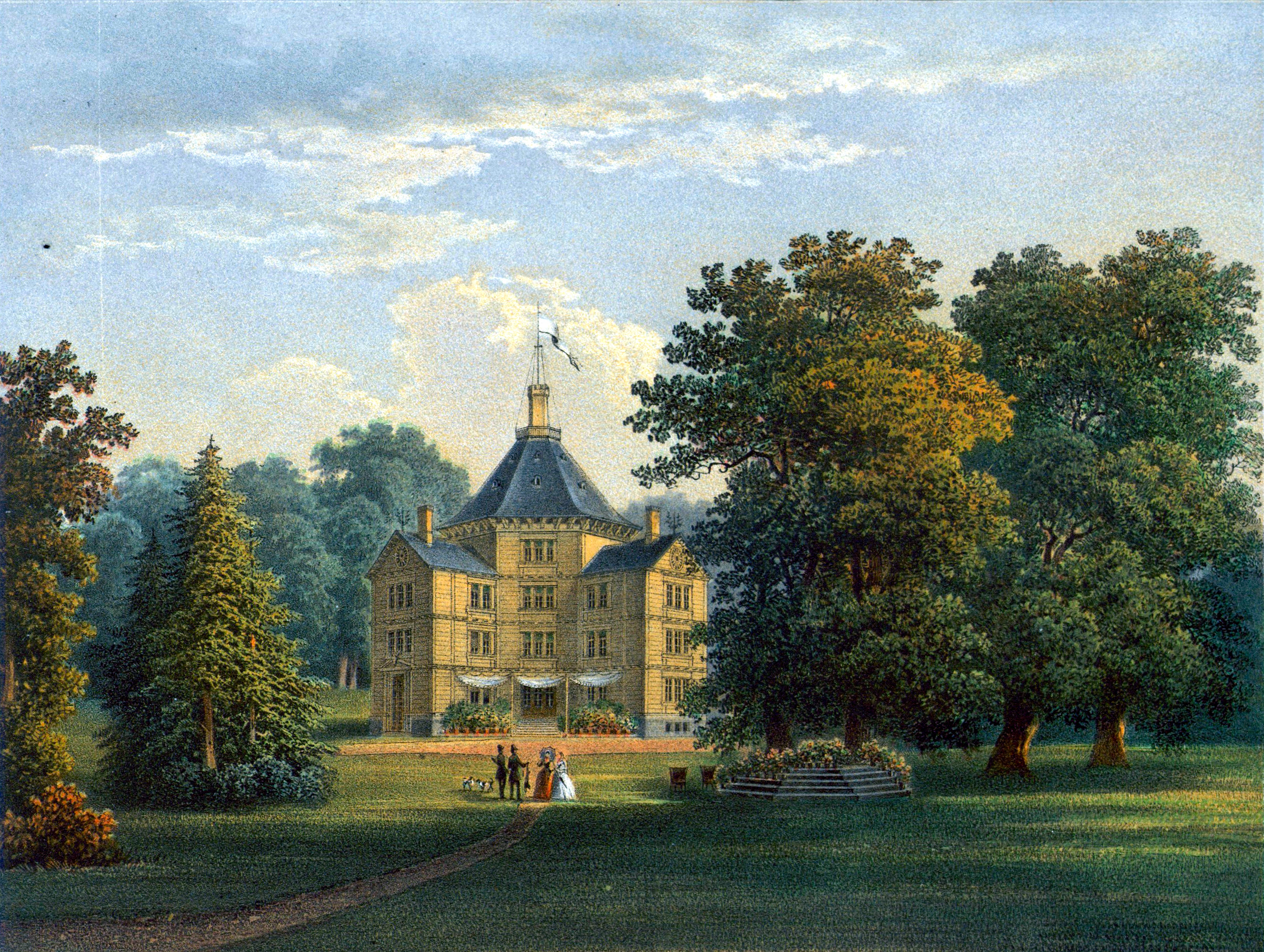
Antonin hunting lodge

Prince Antoni Radziwiłł was a music and art aficionado and he transformed his properties in Berlin to serve as artistic salons, where aristocrats mingled among artists, painters and composers. Radziwiłł's Berlin properties hosted frequent amateur theatre play productions.

Another property Antoni Radziwiłł owned in Prussian-Poland was Antonin, a hunting lodge he had built between 1822 and 1824 by the German architect Karl Friedrich Schinkel, named after him. Later in his life, Antoni Radziwiłł moved permanently to Antonin with his wife, Louise of Prussia, and two daughters Wanda and Eliza. Antoni Radziwiłł was a well-connected composer among European musical circles and with time transformed the Antonin property into a popular musical salon among greatest talents of the area such as Niccolò Paganini, Johann Wolfgang von Goethe, Frédéric Chopin and Ludwig van Beethoven. Chopin gave music lessons to Antoni Radziwiłł's daughter Wanda during his stays at the property. During his stays with Radziwiłł family, Chopin also had composed the Polonaise op.3 and Piano Trio Op. 8 and dedicated the latter to Radziwiłł. Antoni Radziwiłł also supported some of the artists financially, among them Fryderyk Chopin. Chopin's visits to Antonin property were documented by Henryk Siemiradzki in a photogravure titled "Chopin u księcia Radziwiłła" ("Chopin's visit to Prince Radziwill").

== Wealth ==
Possessions of Radziwiłł family are marked in dark blue

The family acquired and maintained great wealth and influence from the 15th–16th century until 1939, when the Second World War started. The Radziwiłł family reached the heights of its importance and power during the Polish Golden Age. However, due to the activities of Janusz Radziwiłł during The Deluge, a series of mid-17th-century campaigns in the Polish–Lithuanian Commonwealth, the family lost much of its wealth and power.

Regarding their wealth, the Radziwiłłs were not inferior to a royal family. In total, the Radziwiłł family has, over the centuries, had in its possession 23 palaces, 426 large and small towns, 2032 estates, and 10,053 villages. In present-day Belarus they possessed towns and boroughs like Haranyony, Davyd-Haradok, Kletsk, Dzyarzhynsk, Kopys, Dakhva, Mir, Nesvizh, Charnauchitsy, and Shchuchyn; in present-day Ukraine: Olyka with dozens of villages in the Wolyn province (Polish: wojewodztwo); in present-day Poland: Szydłowiec with villages in the Sandomierz province and Nieborów; and in present-day Lithuania: Biržai, Dubingiai, Kėdainiai, and others.

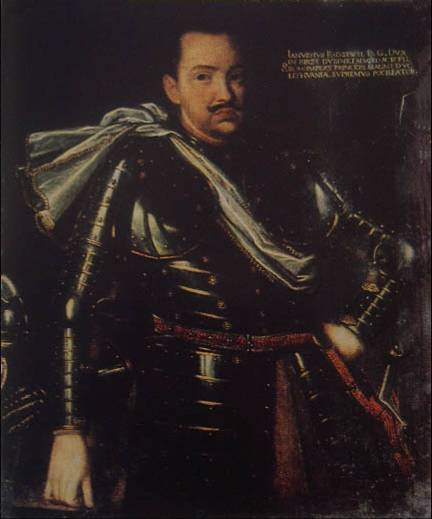
Janusz Radziwiłł (1579–1620)

The Goniądz-Meteliai line possessed, during the 15th – 16th centuries, estates like Goniądz, Zaigrad and Podlaskie Lowlands in Poland. In 1612 the Principality of Slutsk with some thirty-two villages passed over to the Radziwiłłs, after Janusz Radziwiłł had married the heiress Zofia Olelkowicz Słucka. Radziwiłłs also expanded their possessions with Brest, Ashmyany, Krychau, Lida, Mazyr and other administrative territories (starostwos). As a result, the Radziwiłłs were granted a lifetime privilege of being governors (starostas) of those territories. However, during Janusz Radziwiłł's lifetime, the interests between his family and the Polish Crown began to drift apart, as the Radziwiłłs sought to increase their wealth and power, safeguard Protestantism and support ethnically Lithuanian culture, which caused him to join the opposition against King Sigismund III Vasa in 1606.

In 1586, the sons of Mikolaj "the Black" arranged for their fortunes to follow an ordynacja (fee tail), which was to have individual properties inherited by their male descendants; see "Radziwiłł Family Fee Tail". The ordynats of Nesvizh, Kletsk, and Olyka were thus formed. In the 19th century the Davyd-Haradok and Przygodzice ordynats were also established. Other possessions could be inherited by female heirs or alienated. Depending on the importance and size of owned lands, they were called either principalities (Nesvizh, Olyka, Biržai, Dubingiai, Kapyl, Slutsk, Staryi Chortoryisk, Stary Zbaraz, Goniądz and Medele), counties (Mir, Biała Podlaska, Dzyarzhynsk, Kopys, Zabłudów, Kėdainiai, Zolkow, Pomorzani, Belykamen, Kražiai), or estates (Nevel, Krasnoye, Sebezh, Musninkai, Sereya, Horodok, Sobolew, Slovatichi, Ruchai, Kolki, Vyazyn, Rafałówka, Zhmigrod, Beloozero, Yampol, Shumsk, Sverzhen, Drisvyaty, Naliboki). The family ties to the banking dynasties Altoviti and Strozzi played an important role to secure titles and wealth with the Roman Curia.

After the extinction of the Olyka and older Kletsk lines, their fortunes were passed to those of the Nesvizh line. With the death of the heirless Dominik Hieronim in 1813, the Nesvizh line lost its right to the ordynat. Dominik Heronim's son, Aleksander Dominik, was born before his parents' marriage and was thus denied the title and inheritance of his forefathers. He and his descendants had their princely title confirmed by the Austrian Empire. Thus, the ordynat of Nesvizh and Olyka fell into the hands of the younger Kletsk line. This, however, cost the new owner, Antoni Radziwiłł, some diplomatic effort at the Congress of Vienna, as his cousin Dominik had fought in the Polish Legion on Napoleons' side, and Alexander I of Russia had therefore confiscated his whole property. Only because of Prussia's intervention (since Antoni was married to a Prussian princess) he was able to keep the family trust properties, mainly Nesvizh Castle and Olyka Castle with vast lands, while Mir Castle and 18,000 km^{2} of land passed to Dominik's only legitimate child, Stephania, who had to marry a Russian subject, according to the Czar's order, whom she found in Ludwig zu Sayn-Wittgenstein-Berleburg.

In this way, all three Radziwiłł ordynats ended up in the possession of one line, represented by the sons of Michal Hieronim, Ludwik Mikolaj of Kletsk and Antoni Henryk of Nesvizh and Olyka. The descendants of Antoni Henryk formed the beginning of the so-called Ordynant branch, out of the younger Kletsk line, in whose possession, other than the three older ordynats of Nesvizh, Kletsk, and Olyka, they also received the two additional titles of Przygodzice and Davyd-Haradok.

The Radziwiłł family owned 23 castles and palaces. The most fortified of them were in Nesvizh, Olyka, Biržai, Biała, Slutsk, Zolkow, Pomorzany and Zolochiv. The Radziwiłłs possessed palaces in most important cities of the Rzeczpospolita, including those where the Sejm had its sessions (Warsaw, Hrodna), or the Tribunal held its meetings (Vilnius, Lublin, Navahrudak), in province centres where the Radziwiłłs had their estates (Minsk and Lviv), and in the cities where the Radziwiłłs were economically active (Gdańsk, Wrocław). In the 19th and 20th centuries, the Radziwiłłs also owned property in European capitals like Vienna, Dresden, Berlin and Paris. Residences that emerged in the centres of the possessions of the Radziwiłłs reflected the importance of a town in the history of the family. One of these types of residences was Nesvizh in present-day Belarus, which by the 17th century had developed into a most important princely town.

== Residences ==
Over the generations the family members have resided in some notable historic homes. The Radziwiłł family owned a total of 23 palaces. Some of the more prominent of these are:

Residential castles of the Radziwiłł family

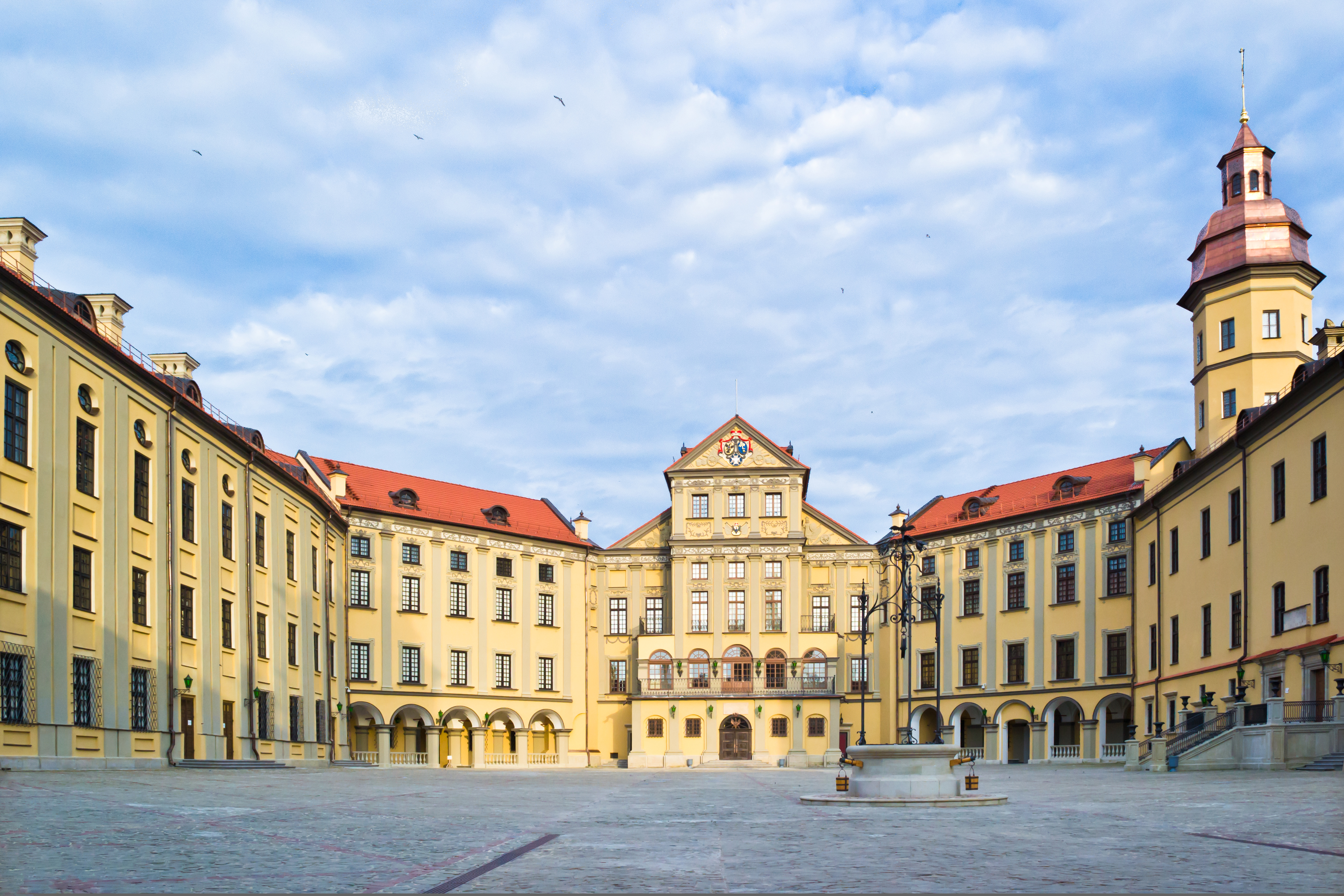
Nesvizh Castle (Nieśwież)

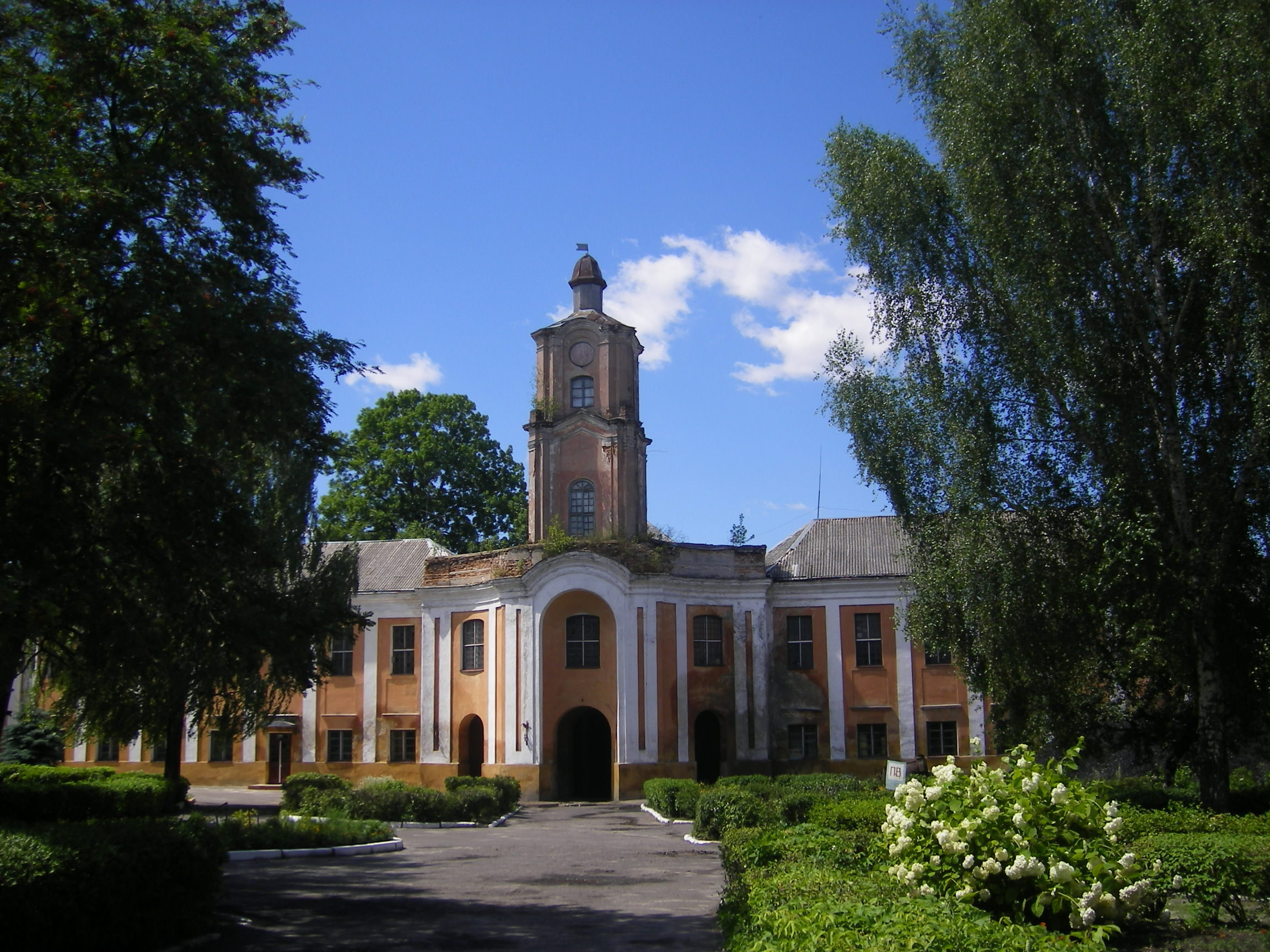
Olyka Castle

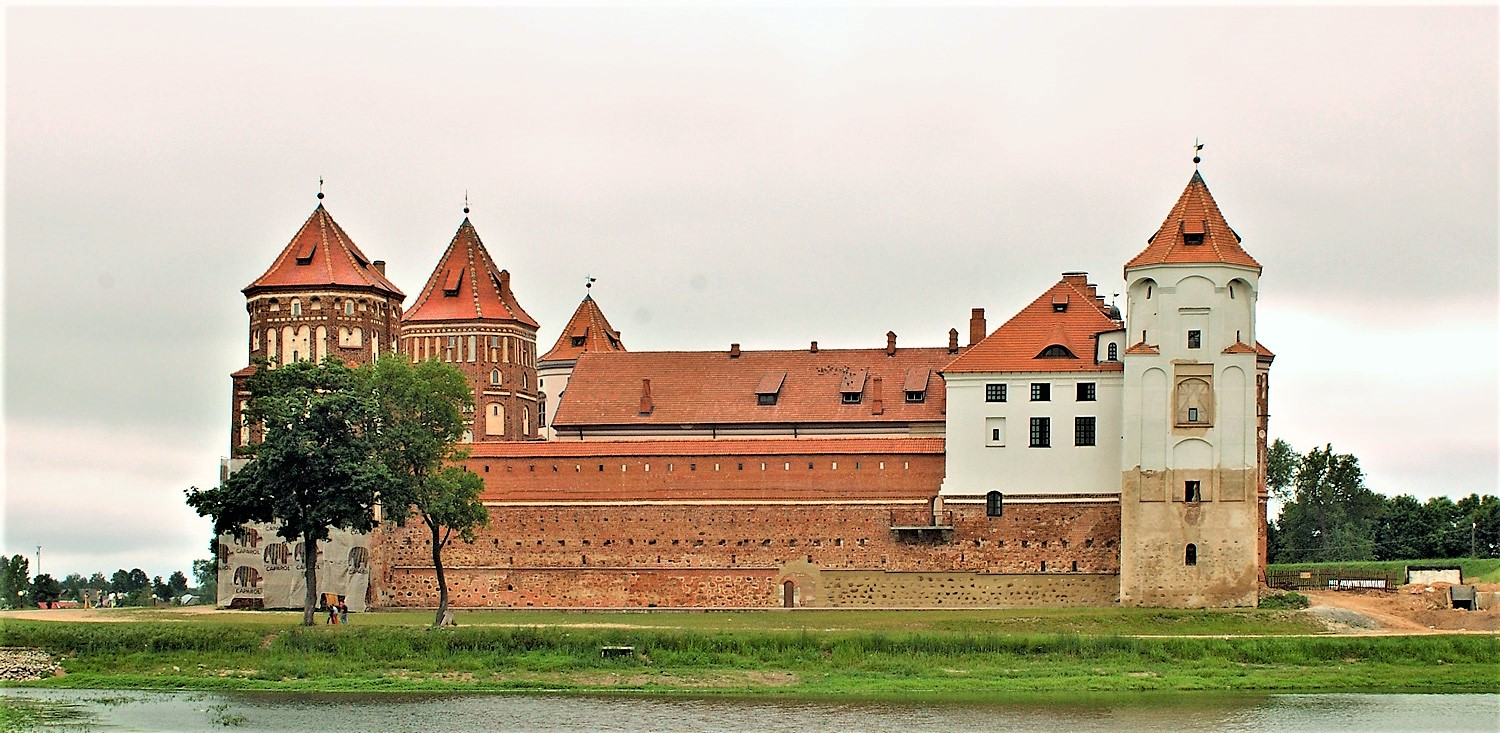
Mir Castle

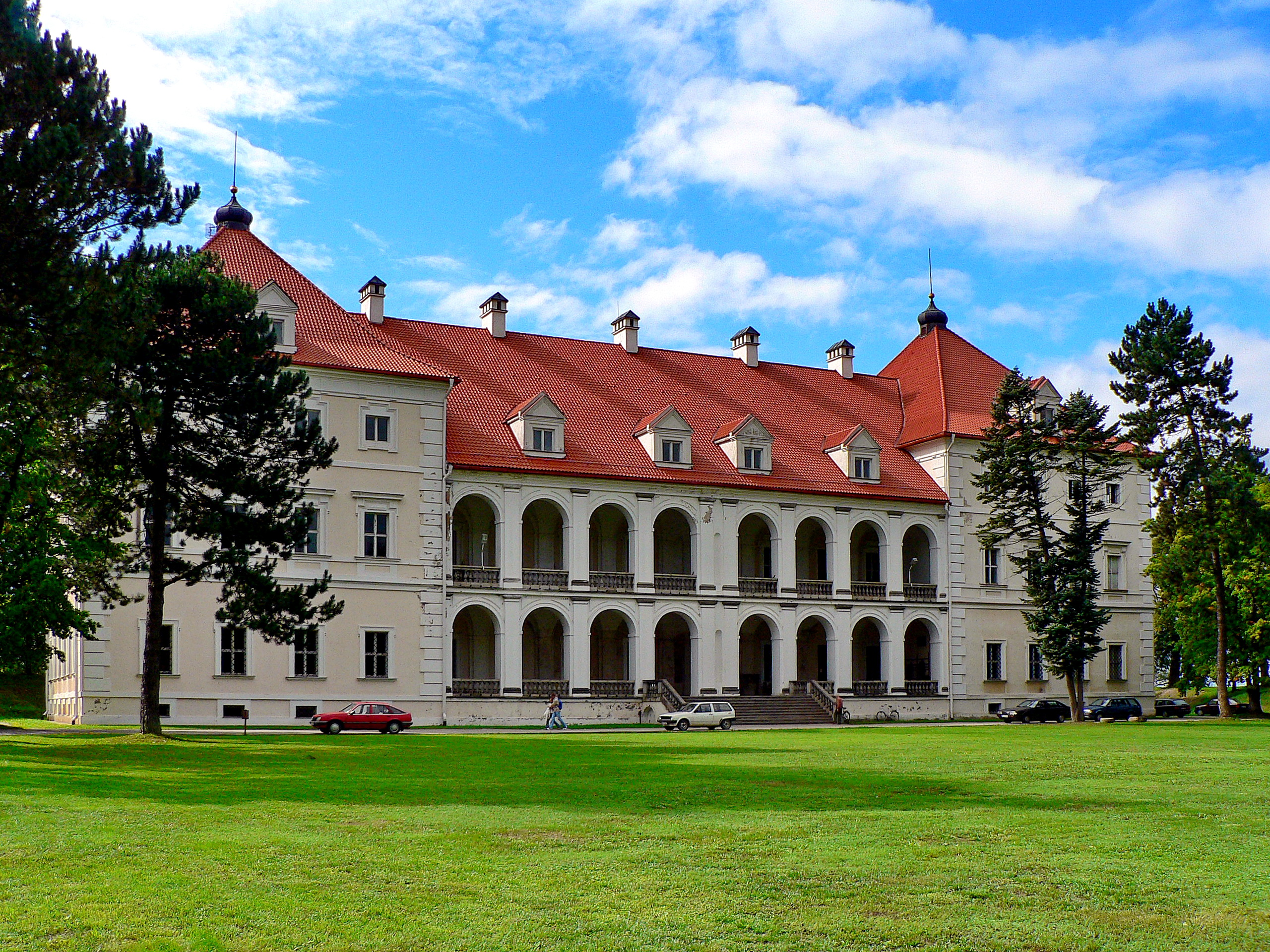
Biržai Castle

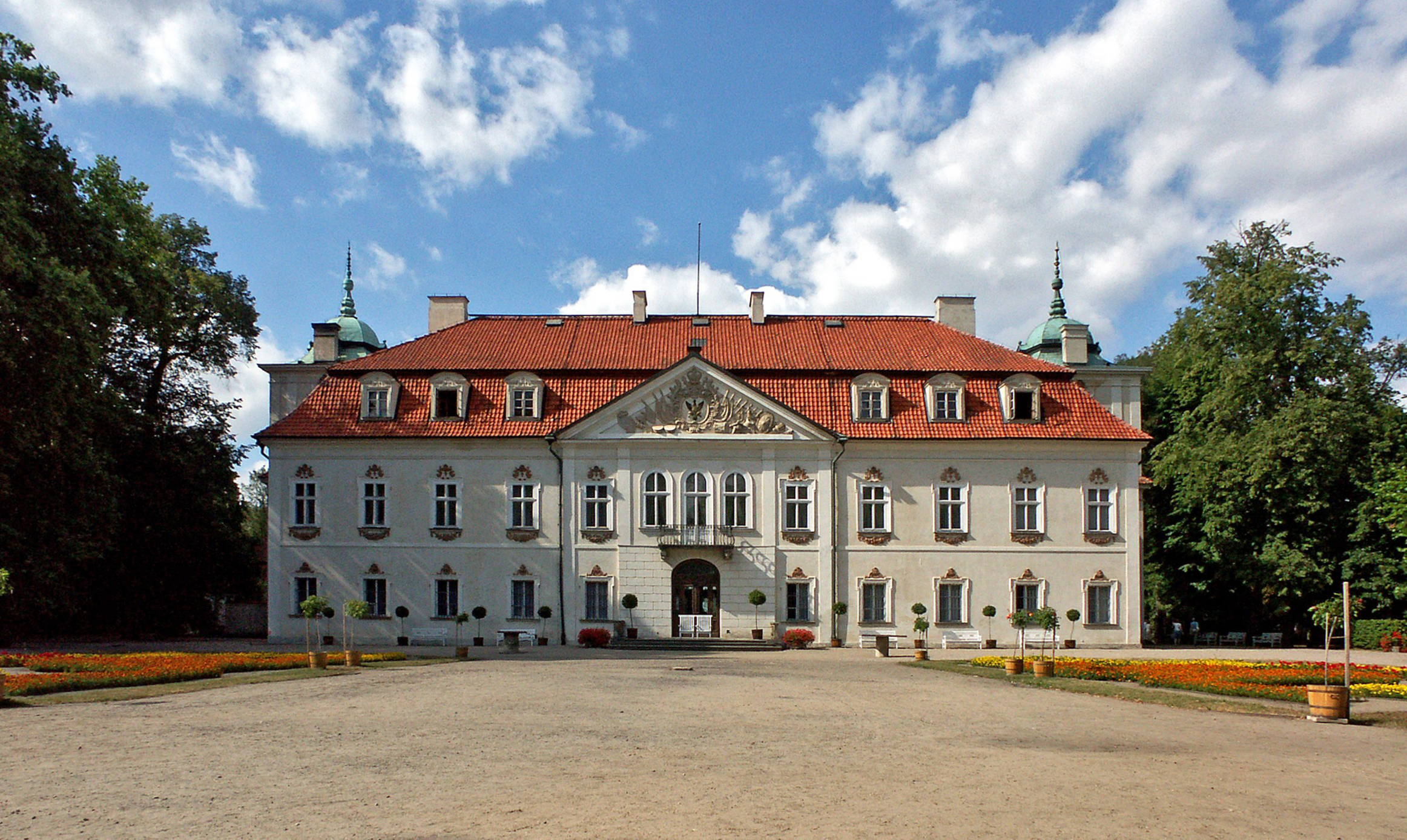
Nieborów Palace

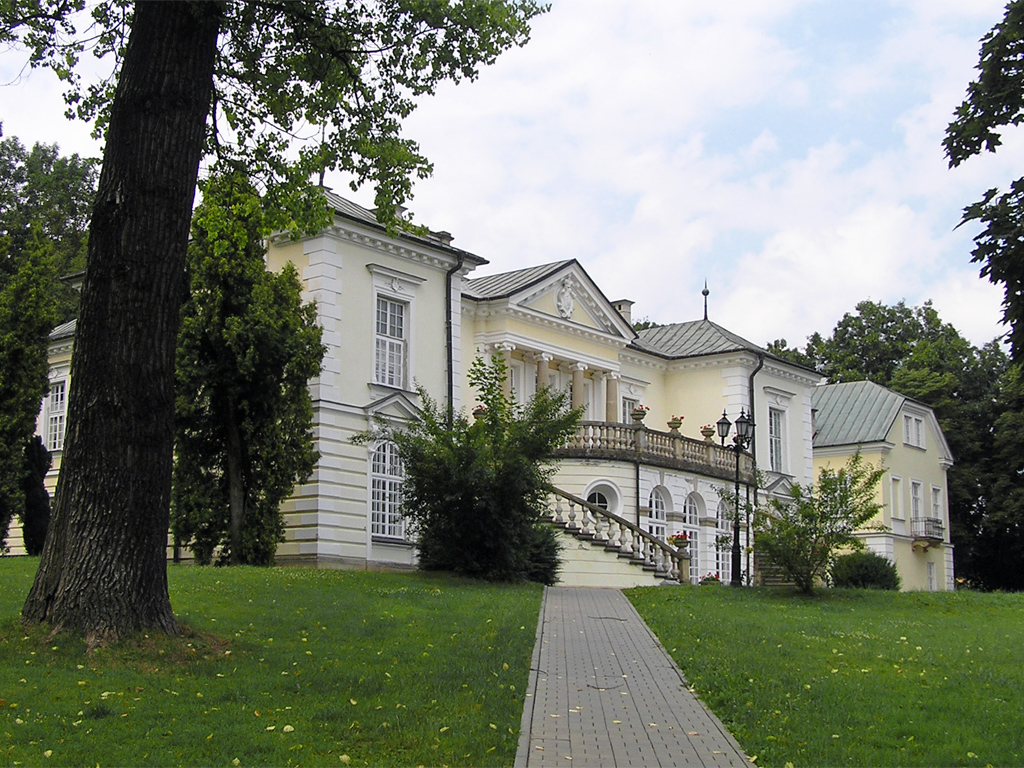
Radziwiłł Palace in Balice

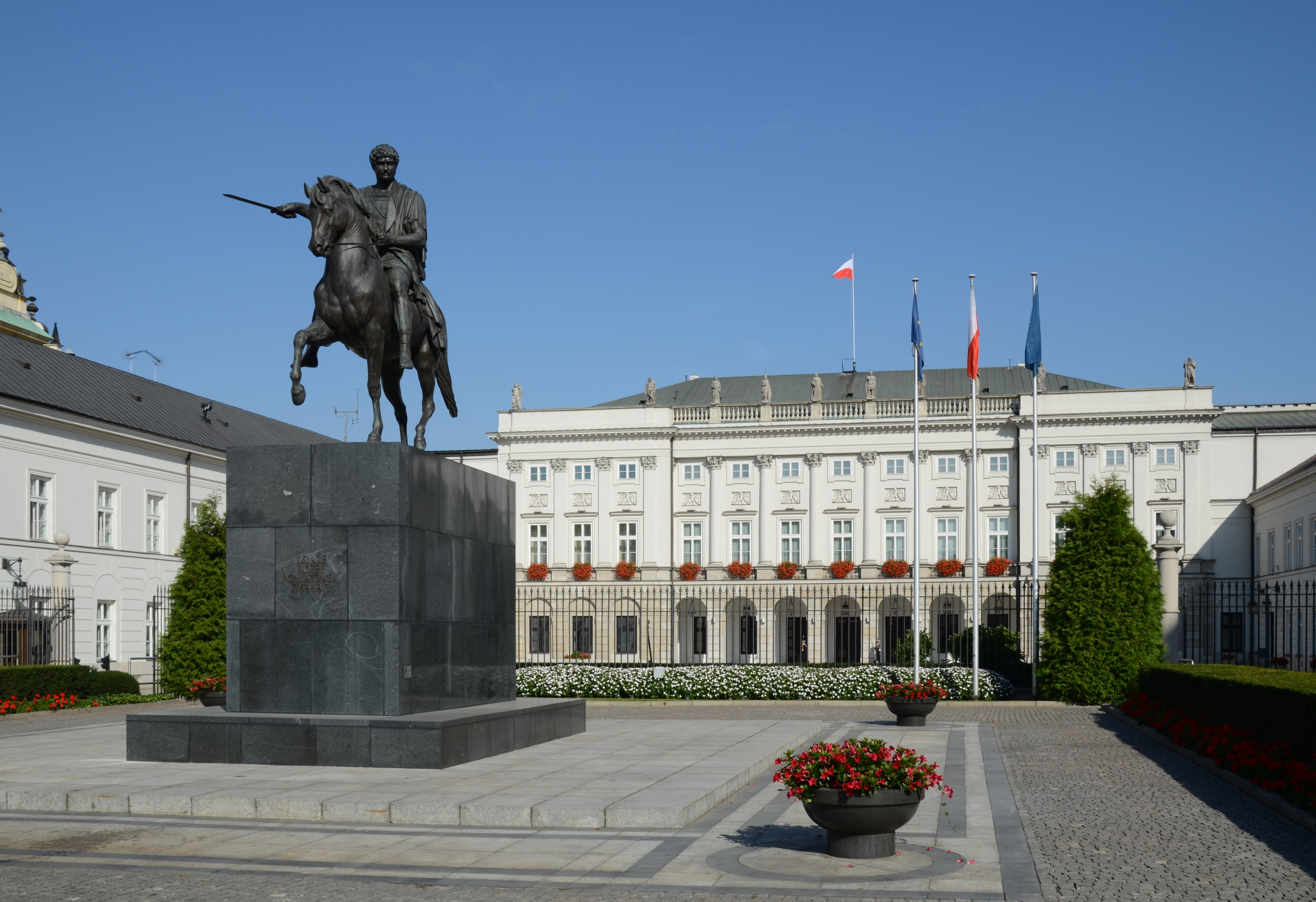
Radziwiłł Palace in Warsaw
- Nesvizh Castle – The property Nieśwież in the Grand Duchy of Lithuania (nowadays located in Belarus) was owned by the Radziwiłł family from 1533, when it was awarded to Mikołaj "the Black" and his brother Jan after the extinction of the Kiszka family. The Lithuanian Archives were moved into the castle in 1551. In 1582, Mikołaj Krzysztof "the Orphan" began construction of a chateau based on the pre-existing structure of the medieval castle, which itself was turned into a renaissance-baroque house. Construction was completed by 1604, and several galleries were added half a century later. In 1706, during the Great Northern War, the castle was sacked, and the Swedish destroyed its fortifications. Several decades later, the Radziwiłłs substantially renovated and enlarged the chateau. In 1770, the castle was seized by Russian forces and the family was expelled. Soon afterwards, the Lithuanian Archives was transferred to Saint Petersburg, while most works of art gathered in the palace were distributed among various Russian nobles. It was again confiscated in 1813 when Dominik Radziwiłł had fought against the Czar on Napoleon's side. Antoni Radziwiłł, belonging to a different branch of the family, was able to get it restituted at the Congress of Vienna. However, he and his family living in Berlin and Prussian-Poland, the remote palace fell into disrepair. Between 1881 and 1886, Antoni Henryk renovated the castle's interiors, being pushed by his French wife, Marie de Castellane. They also designed a landscape park in the English style. In 1939, the Radziwiłł family was again expelled from the castle by the Russians, this time by the invading Red Army during its invasion of Poland. The Corpus Christi Church, built on the premises, contains the coffins of 72 family members, each interred in a simple coffin made of birch and marked with the Trąby Coat of Arms.
- Olyka Castle – A principal seat of the Nesvizh-Kletsk-Olyka line, its construction was initiated by Mikołaj "the Black" and inherited by his son, Stanisław "the Pious". It was expanded in the 18th century. However, due to Dominik Hieronim's involvement in the Napoleonic army, the Russian government confiscated the castle from the family, together with Nieśwież. Antoni Radziwiłł received it in 1815. In the late 19th century, it was also renovated by his grandchildren.
- Mir Castle Complex – A Gothic style castle that passed into the hands of Mikołaj Krzysztof "the Orphan" in 1568, it was finished in the Renaissance style. The Swedes destroyed the complex in 1655 and 1706. After being rebuilt, Karol Stanisław "Panie Kochanku" took up residence. The castle suffered severe damage during the Napoleonic period and was uninhabited for nearly a century before being restored again at the end of the 19th century. In 1813, after the death of Dominik Hieronim, the castle and its enormous estates were inherited by his daughter, Stefania, who married Ludwig zu Sayn-Wittgenstein-Berleburg. The castle then passed to her daughter Mary Sayn-Wittgenstein-Sayn, wife of German chancellor Chlodwig, Prince of Hohenlohe-Schillingsfürst, who was forced to sell it as a foreigner, according to newly introduced law, at the end of the 19th century.
- Biržai Castle – The construction of this earth bastion-type castle was ordered by Krzysztof Mikołaj "Perkūnas" Radziwiłł in 1586 and was completed in 1589. The castle became the main seat of the Biržai-Dubingiai line after it was moved from Dubingiai during the second half of the 17th century. During the Polish–Swedish wars in 1625, the castle was destroyed and surrendered. The family regained the castle in 1626 and rebuilt it from 1662 to 1669 in the Renaissance style. In the following war with Sweden in 1704, the castle and its fortifications were destroyed again and abandoned. At the beginning of the 19th century, the castle was sold to the Tyszkiewicz family.
- Radziwiłł Palace in Warsaw – Purchased from the Lubomirski family in 1674 by Michał Kazimierz Radziwiłł, the Nesvizh-Kletsk-Olyka line held the palace in its possession for 144 years until Dominik Hieronim died heirless in 1813. It was purchased in 1818 by the government of Congress Poland. It is the official seat of the President of the Republic of Poland.
- Nieborów Palace – Built between 1690 and 1696 on the site of an older castle, the palace came into the ownership of Michał Hieronim Radziwiłł in the late 18th century. He had its interior furnished with rococo and early classicist ornaments designed by Szymon Bogumił Zug. The next owner was his son Antoni Radziwiłł. During the ownership of Janusz Radziwiłł (1880–1967), the palace became a meeting place for many eminences in the interwar period, and during the German occupation in World War II, a meeting point for the Home Army, a Polish resistance movement. After the war, the estate was expropriated by the Polish state and became subsidiaries of the National Museum in Warsaw.
- Dubingiai Castle – A masonry castle acquired in 1508 by Jerzy and later reconstructed by the family in the Renaissance style, it was the main seat of the Biržai-Dubingiai line until the second half of the 17th century. After the death of Jerzy, his son Mikolaj "the Red" inherited the property, causing the town nearby to become an important hub for the Reformation in Lithuania. During the Polish-Swedish wars, the castle was pillaged by armies loyal to the King of Poland and was confiscated from Bogusław. It returned to the family in the second half of the 17th century. Before 1620, a mausoleum was additionally built near the castle by Janusz I. The remains of several family members, including Mikołaj "the Black", his wife Elżbieta Szydłowiecka, Mikołaj "the Red", and those of its creator, Janusz I, were recently found to be interred there. The neglected castle and church gradually fell into ruins, which were sold to Michał Tyszkiewicz in 1808.
- Lubcha Castle – A fortified residence that passed into the hands of Janusz II, it was expanded to have an additional three stone towers. In 1655, it was seized and devastated by Cossacks under the command of Ivan Zolotarenko during the Russo-Polish war. It was then passed to another set of owners.
- Radziwiłł Palace in Vilnius – Mikołaj "the Black"'s wooden Vilnius mansion was likely on the same site. Still, the current building was constructed by order of Janusz from 1635 until 1653. During the various wars in the late 17th century, the palace was unoccupied. In 1807, Dominik Hieronim donated the property to the Philanthropist Society. It was further devastated during World War I, and only the northern wing of the palace survived. Today, a division of the Lithuanian Art Museum is located there, on Vilniaus Str. 22. In one hall, one can see 165 portraits of the Radziwiłł family. These engravings were commissioned by Michał Kazimierz "Rybeńko" and carried out by artist H. Leybowisc.
- Pac-Radziwiłł Palace – The palace was constructed for Dominik Mikołaj at the end of the 17th century. It was the property of the Radziwiłł family to the beginning of the 19th century, with breaks in ownership from 1744 to 1759 and 1762 to 1775. Around 1757, offices were built. During the Warsaw Uprising of 1794, it was partially destroyed. During the Prussian occupation from 1807 to 1809, the unoccupied building hosted a theatre, later becoming an army bunker and a lazaretto. It was bought by Ludwik Michał Pac in 1825. It is located on ul. Miodowa No. 15 and currently houses the Ministry of Health of the Republic of Poland.

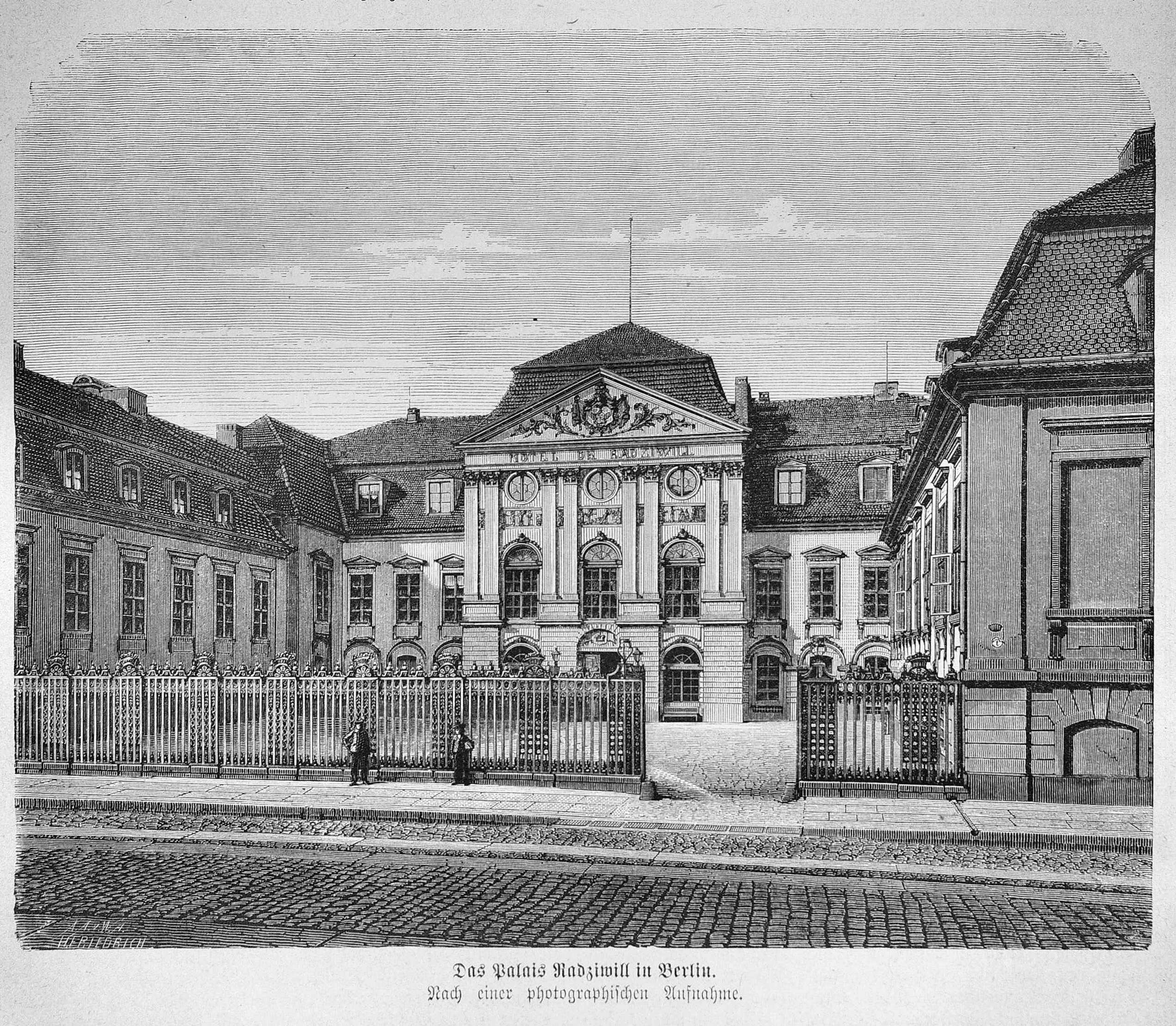
Radziwiłł Palace in Berlin

- Radziwiłł Palace in Berlin – A city palace located on Wilhelmstrasse No. 77. The palace, built in 1738, was purchased by Antoni Radziwiłł after his marriage with Princess Louise of Prussia. The Palais Radziwiłł played hosts to regular visits from well-known personalities, artists and academics, playing a major role in promoting Prussian-Polish relationships in Berlin. In addition, the Palais Radziwiłł was a meeting point for Polish politicians in the Prussian Parliament where they could exchange ideas and opinions on how to solve the long-standing question of what to do about Poland. In 1869 the palace was acquired by the Prussian state government from Antoni Henryk. It was turned into the old Reich Chancellery for Otto von Bismarck. In 1933 Adolf Hitler became chancellor of Germany and moved into the Palace. He used the Palace as a private residence after his adjacent New Reich Chancellery was completed in Voßstrasse. When the Red Army invaded Berlin in 1945, the palace was so heavily damaged that it had to be demolished in 1949, as was the New Chancellery. Hitler had shot himself dead in its bunker.

== Family members ==
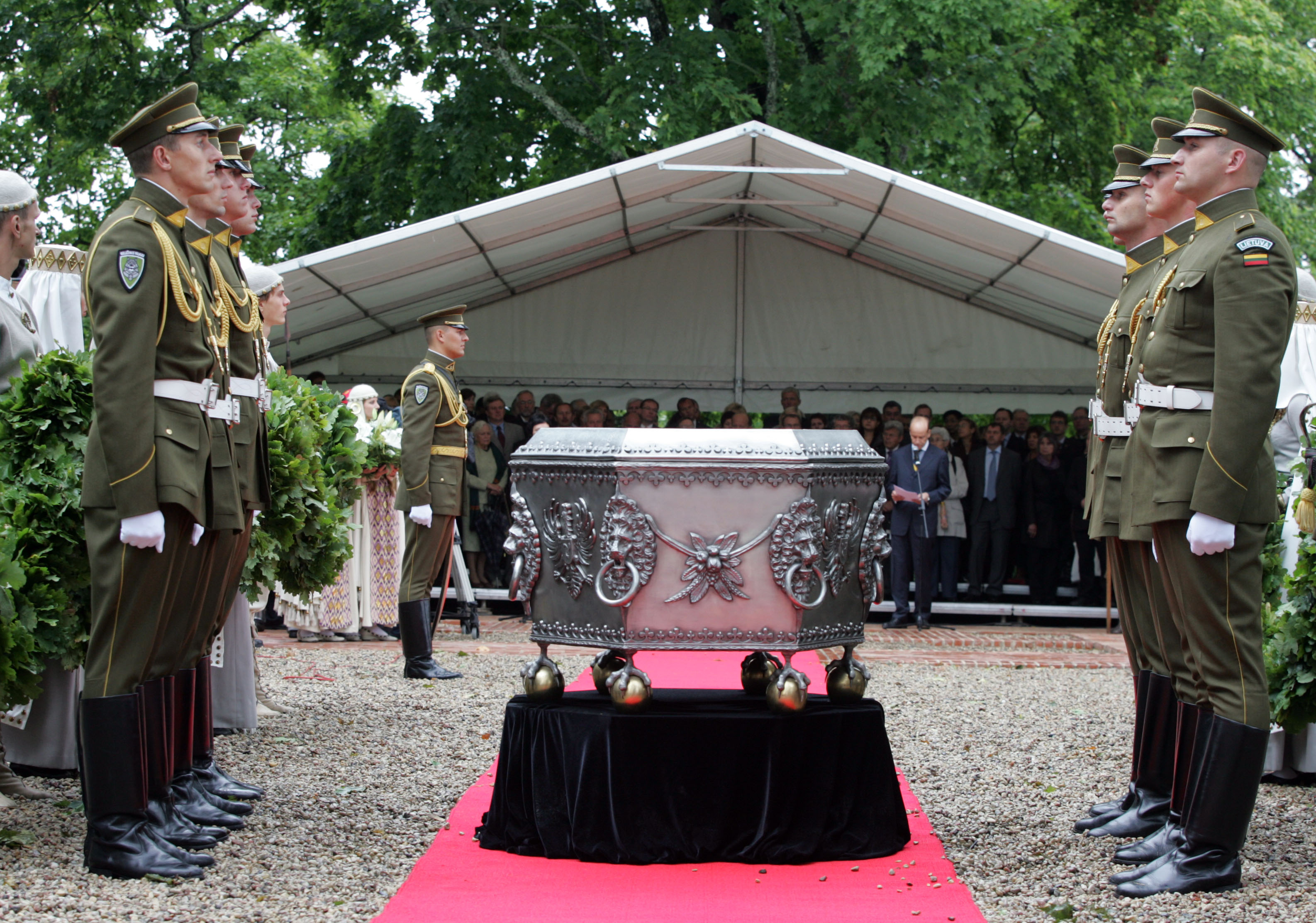
Reburial ceremony of Radvillas in Dubingiai, Lithuania

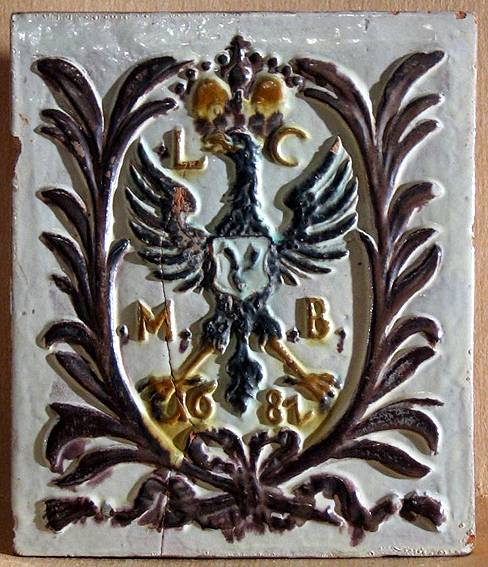
A 17th-century tile with the coat of arms and initials of Ludwika Karolina Radziwiłł from Biržai Castle

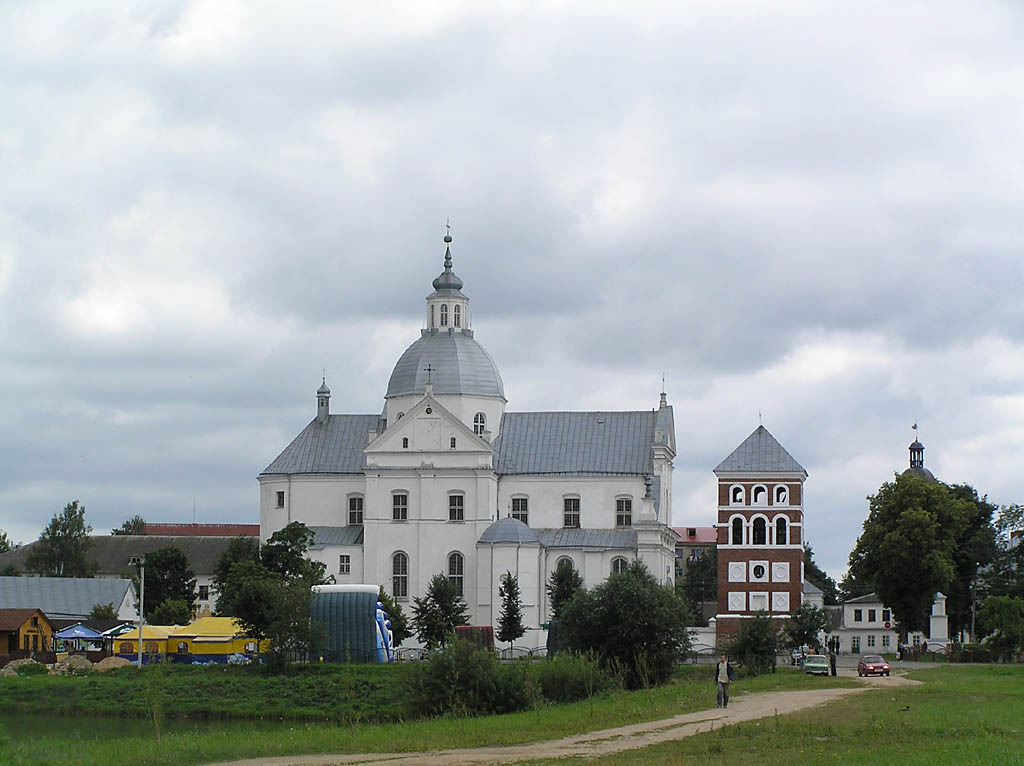
Corpus Christi Church, Nesvizh (1587–93) is the family sepulchre of the Radziwiłł family in Nesvizh.

Loreto's Mother of God (or the Radziwiłłs madonna)

The Radziwiłł family members include:

- Mikalojus Radvila the Old, c. 1450–1509, voivode, chancellor
- Mikołaj II Radziwiłł, 1470–1521, chancellor
- Jerzy Radziwiłł, 1480–1541, hetman, voivode, castellan, marshal
- Mikołaj III Radziwiłł, c. 1492–1530, Bishop of Samogitia
- Mikołaj "the Red" Radziwiłł, 1512–1584, hetman, chancellor
- Mikołaj "the Black" Radziwiłł, 1515–1565, marshal, chancellor, palatine

Since 1515 both Mikolajs and the Radziwiłł family were elevated to Reichsfürsten of the Holy Roman Empire.

- Barbara Radziwiłł, 1523?–1551, Queen of Poland
- Anna Radziwiłł, 1525–1600
- Mikołaj VII Radziwiłł, 1546–1589, chamberlain
- Krzysztof Mikołaj "the Lightning" Radziwiłł, 1547–1603, hetman
- Mikołaj Krzysztof "the Orphan" Radziwiłł 1549–1616, voivode, marshall, castellan, prince
- Grzegorz Radziwiłł, 1558–1600, Cardinal of Kraków 1591–1600
- Krystyna Radziwiłł, 1560–1580
- Grzegorz Radziwiłł, 1578–1613, castellan
- Janusz Radziwiłł, 1579–1620, castellan
- Krzysztof II Radziwiłł, 1585–1640, hetman
- Albert III Radziwiłł, 1589–1636, castellan
- Aleksander Ludwik Radziwiłł, 1594–1654, voivode, Grand Marshal of Lithuania
- Albrycht Stanisław Radziwiłł, 1595–1656, chancellor
- Janusz Radziwiłł, 1612–1655, hetman, voivode
- Bogusław Radziwiłł, 1620–1669
- Michał Kazimierz Radziwiłł, 1625–1680, hetman, chancellor
- Ludwika Karolina Radziwiłł, 1667–1695
- Karol Stanisław Radziwiłł, 1669–1719, Grand Chancellor of Lithuania
- Katarzyna Barbara Radziwiłł, 1693–1730
- Michał Kazimierz "Rybeńko" Radziwiłł, 1702–1762
- Karol Stanisław "Panie Kochanku" Radziwiłł, 1734–1790, voivode of Vilnius and Marshal of the Bar Confederation
- Antoni Henryk Radziwiłł, 1775–1833, statholder
- Michał Gedeon Radziwiłł, 1778–1850, senator, general
- Wilhelm Radziwiłł, 1797–1870, Prussian general of the infantry and chairman of the Numsmatic Society in Berlin
- Elisa Radziwill, 1803–1834, cousin and desired bride of Wilhelm I, German Emperor
- Marcelina Czartoryska née Radziwiłł, 1817–1894, concert pianist, pupil of Frédéric Chopin
- Antoni Wilhelm Radziwiłł, 1833–1904, Prussian general
- Constantin Radziwiłł, 1850–1920, married Louise Blanc, daughter of François Blanc, founder of Monte-Carlo
- Léon Radziwiłł, his son, First World War hero, owner of the Château of Ermenonville, friend and model of Marcel Proust
- Gabrielle Radziwill, 1877–1968, nurse and activist
- Louise Radziwiłł, 1877–1942, his sister, married Armand de La Rochefoucauld, duc de Doudeauville
- Catherine Radziwill née Rzewuska, 1858–1941, Polish princess, stalked and ruined the career of Cecil Rhodes
- Janusz Radziwiłł 1880–1967, senator
- Krzysztof Mikołaj Radziwiłł, 1898–1986, nicknamed "The Red Prince", Member of the Sejm under the Communist regime
- Artur Mikołaj Radziwiłł, 1901–1939, decorated WWI and WWII hero, fallen in combat in September 1939
- Stanisław Albrecht Radziwiłł 1914–1976, married Caroline Lee Bouvier, younger sister of First Lady Jacqueline Kennedy
- Maciej Mikołaj Antoni Radziwiłł, 1930–2009, Polish physicist, engineer and inventor
- Roza XVI Radziwiłł, now Roza Broel-Plater, b. 25 December 1934, Polish Princess
- Dominik Radziwiłł, first husband (m. 1938) of Princess Eugénie of Greece and Denmark
- Anna Radziwiłł, 1939–2009, Polish senator, minister, secretary of state
- Tatiana Radziwiłł, 1939–2025, bacteriologist and second cousin and close friend of Queen Sofía of Spain
- George Andrew Dominique Jerome Peter Leon Radziwill, 1942–2001
- Jan Stanisław Albrycht Radziwiłł, b. 1947 (son of Stanisław Albrecht Radziwiłł from his second marriage with Grace Kolin)
- Konstanty Radziwiłł, b. 1958 r., Polish doctor, Minister of Health
- Krzysztof Konstanty Radziwiłł, b. 1958, Baliff of Poland of the Order of Saint Lazarus
- Anthony Radziwill, 1959–1999, Swiss-born American filmmaker and television executive
- Anna Christina Radziwill, b. 1960, Daughter of Stanislas Radziwill and Caroline Lee Bouvier (Lee Radziwill), sister of Anthony
- Maciej Radziwiłł, b. 1961, entrepreneur, manager, philanthropist
- Carole Radziwill, b. 1963, American journalist and writer, wife of Anthony
- Ülker Radziwill, b. 1966, German politician
- Artur Maciej Radziwiłł, b. 1974, Polish economist, deputy minister of finance

== Gallery ==
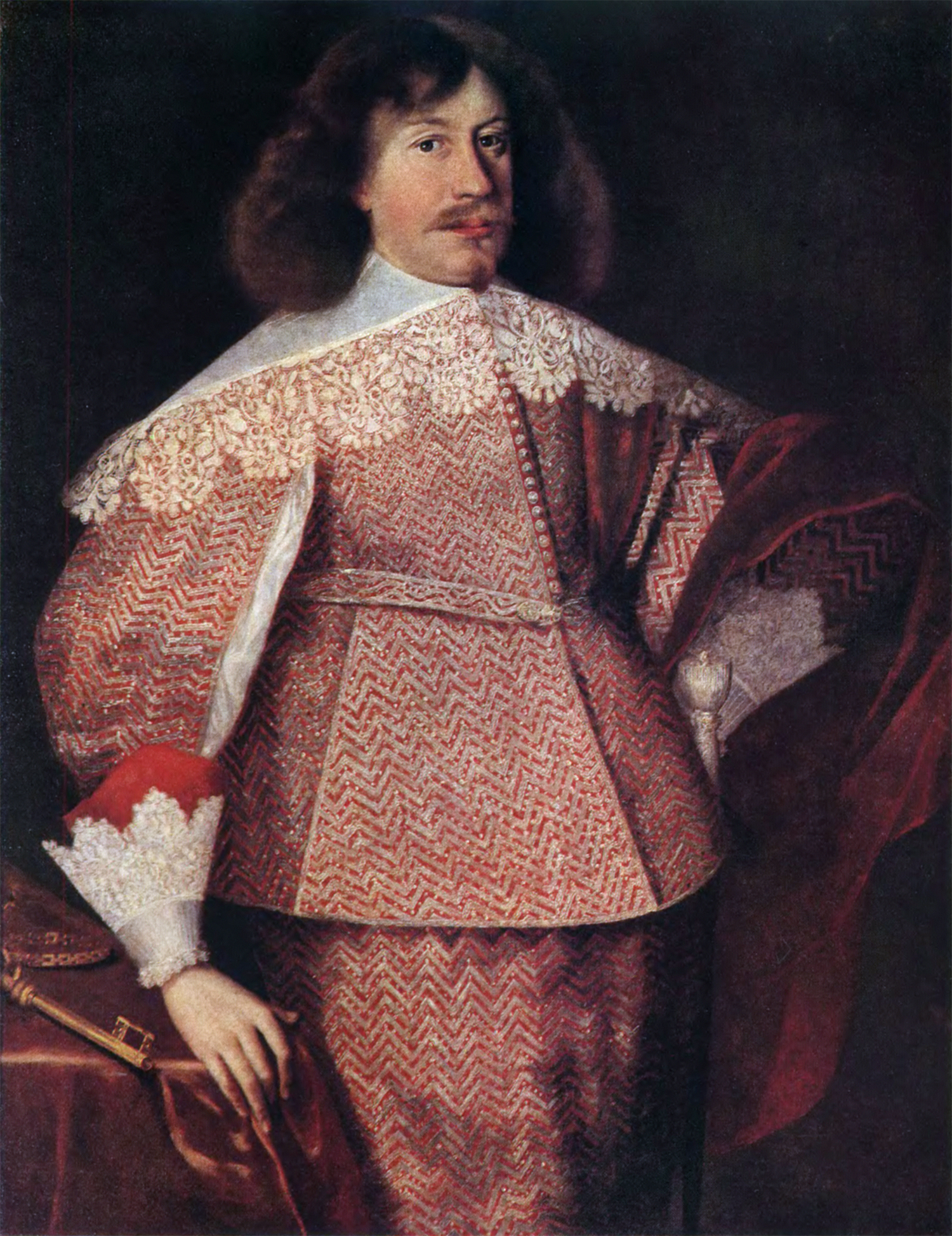
Janusz

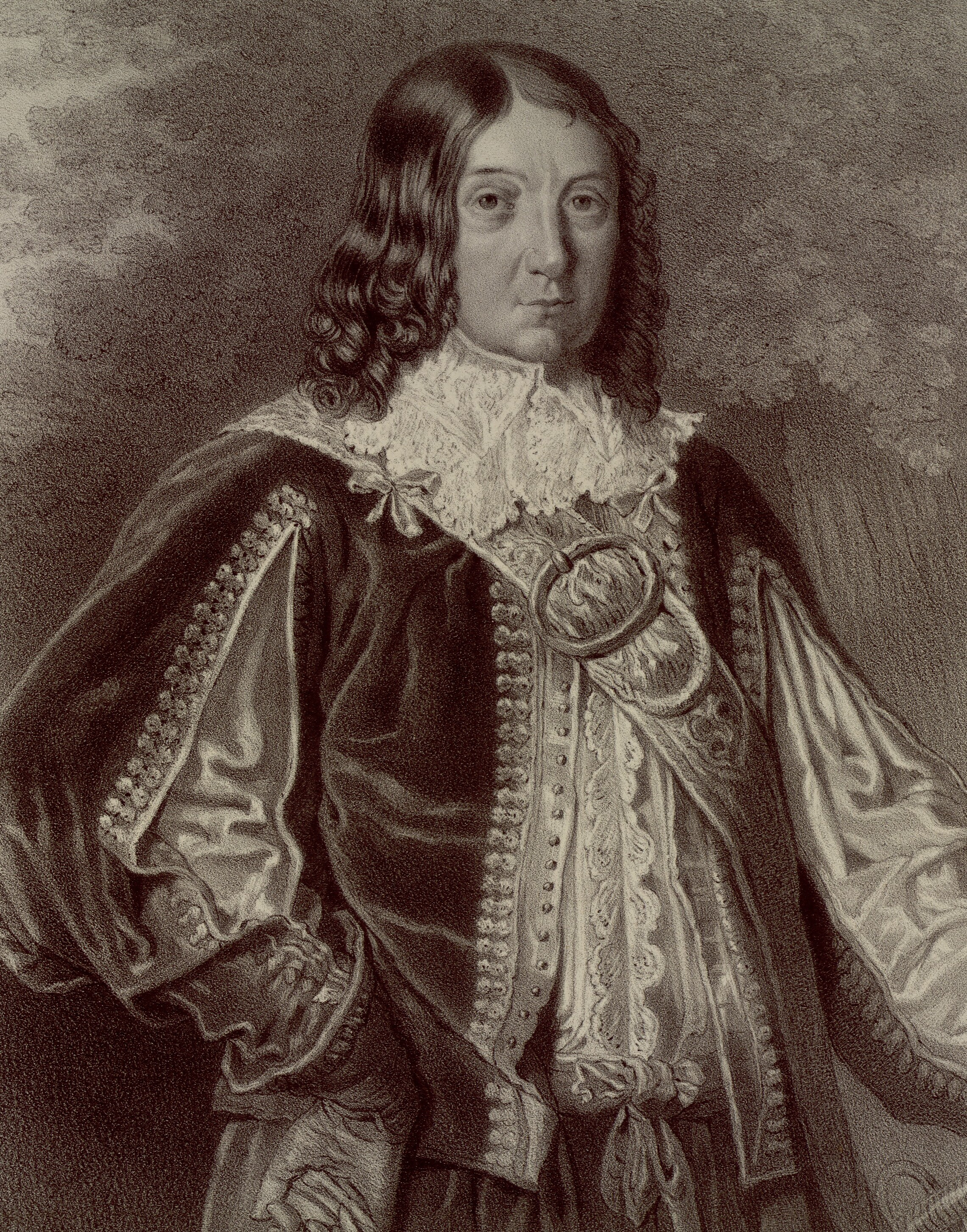
Michał Kazimierz

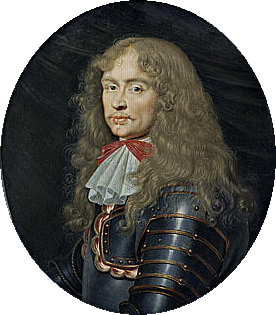
Bogusław

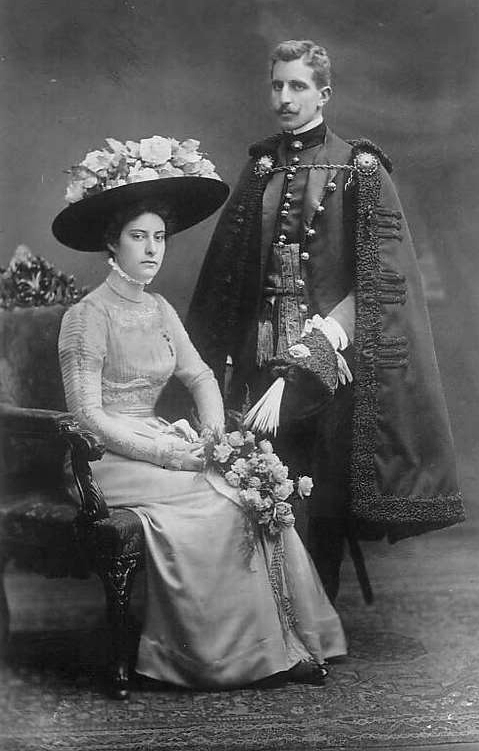
Prince Hieronim Mikołaj Radziwiłł and Archduchess Renata, 1909

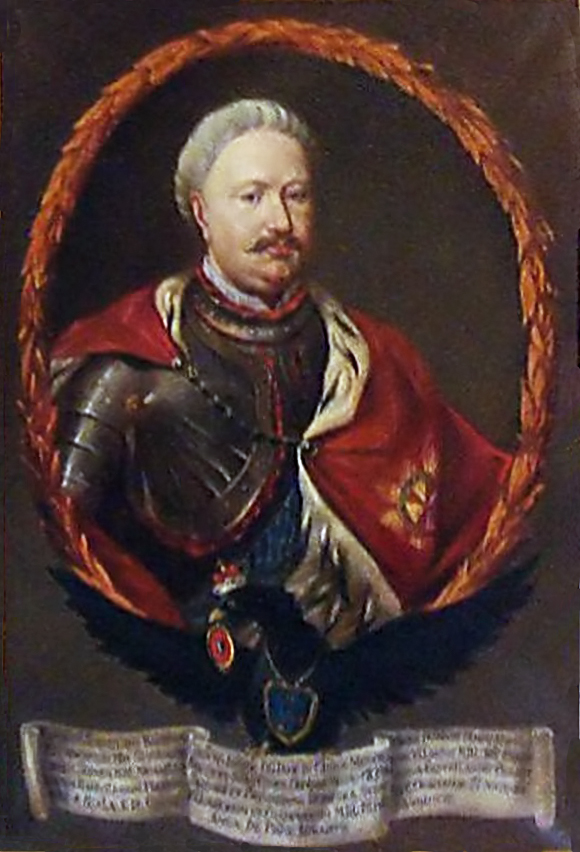
Karol Stanisław Radziwiłł

== See also ==
- Gabrielle Radziwill
- Radziwill Castle (disambiguation)
- Radziwiłł Chronicle
- Polish Institute and Sikorski Museum
