= Janusz Radziwiłł =

Janusz Radziwiłł is the name of several Polish–Lithuanian nobles:

- Janusz Radziwiłł (1579–1620), castellan of Vilnius and the starost of Borysów
- Janusz Radziwiłł (1612–1655), signatory of the Union of Kėdainiai
- Janusz Radziwiłł (1880–1967), conservative politician in the Second Polish Republic
