= Turville Grange =

House in Turville Heath, Buckinghamshire, England

Coordinates: 51.6134°N 0.9227°W

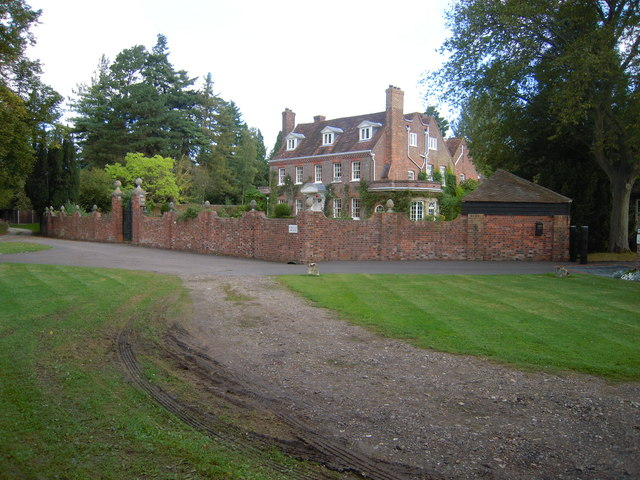
Turville Grange, seen from the common

Turville Grange is a large detached house in the village of Turville Heath in the English county of Buckinghamshire. It was built in the late 18th century and expanded and altered c.1890 for a Stephen Smith. It has been listed Grade II on the National Heritage List for England since June 1955. A wing to the rear of the house was added by Walter Tapper in the 1900s.

== History ==
In 1904 the estate was bought by Julia Caroline Stonor, the Marquise d'Hautpoul de Seyre.

The wrought iron gates at the Grange were given to the d'Hautpoul's by Queen Alexandra between 1906 and 1908, who was a frequent visitor. In the 1950s Lionel Brett added dormers and a pedimented door surround to accentuate the Grange's Georgian style at the behest of his father, Oliver Sylvain Baliol Brett, 3rd Viscount Esher.

=== Radziwill period ===
The 49-acre estate of Turville Grange was bought by Lee Radziwill and her husband Prince Stanislas Radziwill for £55,000 in 1966 (equivalent to £894,622 in 2025). Turville Grange was featured in the July 1971 issue of Vogue, photographed by Horst P. Horst.

=== Ford period ===
After the Radziwill's divorce in 1974, the estate was sold to Henry Ford II.

Renzo Mongiardino's design for the entrance hall at Turville Grange was profiled in a 2018 article in Architectural Digest
