= Radziwill Castle =

Radziwill Castle is a castle once owned by the Radziwiłł family of the Crown of the Kingdom of Poland and the Grand Duchy of Lithuania.

It may refer to:

- Biržai Castle
- Dubingiai Castle
- Mir Castle
- Niasviž Castle
- Olyka Castle
- Lubcha Castle
- Radziwiłł Palace in Warsaw
- Radziwiłł Palace in Vilnius
- Radziwill Palace in Berlin
