= Janusz Radziwiłł (1880–1967) =

Polish nobleman and politician

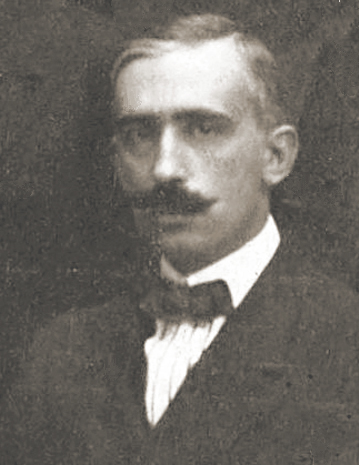
- Born: Janusz Franciszek Radziwiłł; 3 September 1880; Berlin, German Empire
- Died: 4 October 1967 (aged 87); Warsaw, Poland
- Style: His Serene Highness, Prince Radziwiłł, Ordinat of Ołyka
- Spouse: Anna Lubomirska (m. 1905; died 1947)
- Children: Edmund Ferdynand Radziwiłł; Krystyna Maria Radziwiłł; Ludwik Ferdynand Radziwiłł; Stanisław Albrecht Radziwiłł
- Parent(s): Ferdynand Radziwiłł; Pelagia Sapieha
- Relatives: Michał Radziwiłł Rudy (brother); Bogusław Fryderyk Radziwiłł (grandfather)

Prince Janusz Franciszek Radziwiłł (3 September 1880 – 4 October 1967) was a Polish prince and politician.

== Early life ==
Prince Radziwiłł was born on 3 September 1880 in Berlin in the then German Empire. He was the son of Prince Ferdynand Radziwiłł (1834–1926) and Princess Pelagia Sapieha-Kodenska. His siblings were Michał Radziwiłł Rudy, Karol Ferdynand Radziwiłł, Małgorzata.

His paternal grandparents were Prince Ferdynand Radziwiłł and Countess Leontyna von Clary und Aldringen. His maternal grandparents were Prince Léon Sapieha-Kodenski and Countess Johanna Tyszkiewicz. His great-grandfather was Prince Anton Radziwill and his great-grandmother was Princess Louise of Prussia (1770–1836).

== Career ==
During the First World War, he was a member of the government of the Kingdom of Poland and was a potential candidate for the Lithuanian crown, as he was closely related to the Imperial family and was a member of one of the most potent families of the ancient Grand Duchy of Lithuania.

He had a long career as a conservative politician in the Second Polish Republic. From 1919 to 1920, he was the Polish envoy to London and served as the Polish Foreign Minister from 1920 to 1921.

He was a supporter of Józef Piłsudski, member of his BBWR coalition, Sejm deputy from 1928 to 1935 and a member of the Polish Senate from 1935 to 1939. Despite being a supporter of the government, he was critical of sanacja's excesses (persecution of political opponents, censorship). In 1937 he joined the Camp of National Unity (OZON).

After the Soviet invasion of Poland in 1939, he was arrested by the NKVD. Imprisoned in the infamous Lubyanka prison, he was personally interrogated by Lavrentiy Beria. He was released after a few months after international pressure from, among others, the Italian royal family (due to the prestige of the Radziwiłł family). He returned to Nazi occupied Poland, where he tried to use his prestige to improve Nazi treatment of the Poles; he met with Hermann Göring (whom he knew from before the war) but his efforts were futile. He was briefly imprisoned by the Germans during the Warsaw Uprising in 1944.

After the war in 1945 he was again arrested by NKVD; his wife would die in a communist prison in 1947. He was eventually released, with most of his possessions confiscated and nationalized by the communist government. In 1959, the Polish government gave the 79 year old a passport to visit his son and daughter in England and Spain.

== Personal life ==
On 9 December 1905, Radziwiłł was married to Princess Anna Jadwiga Maria Lubomirska (1882–1947) in Rivne, now in Ukraine. She was the daughter of Prince Stanislaw Lubomirski and Princess Wanda Lubomirska. Together, they were the parents of:

- Prince Edmund Ferdynand Radziwiłł (1906–1971), who married Princess Izabella Radziwiłł (b. 1915), daughter of Prince Charles Radziwiłł and Princess Izabella Radziwiłł, on 2 June 1934.
- Princess Krystyna Maria Radziwiłł (1908–2003), who married Count Józef Alfred Potocki (1895–1968), son of Count Józef Potocki and Princess Helena Radziwiłł, on 8 October 1930. Prince Potocki was the Polish exile government's Ambassador to Spain.
- Prince Ludwik Ferdynand Radziwiłł (1911–1928), who died at the age of 16 in Pszczyna, Poland.
- Prince Stanisław Albrecht Radziwiłł (1914–1976), who was married three times, lastly to Caroline Lee Bouvier Canfield (1933–2019), sister of American First Lady Jacqueline Kennedy.

Radziwiłł died in his two-room apartment in Warsaw, Poland on 4 October 1967, Before the War, he owned two palaces in Warsaw. He was buried in Poland.

== Ancestry ==
Ancestors of Janusz Radziwiłł (1880–1967)

16. Prince Michał Hieronim Radziwiłł
8. Prince Antoni Radziwiłł
17. Helena Przeździecka
4. Prince Bogusław Fryderyk Radziwiłł
18. Prince Augustus Ferdinand of Prussia
9. Princess Louise of Prussia
19. Margravine Elisabeth Louise of Brandenburg-Schwedt
2. Prince Ferdynand Radziwiłł
20. Johann, 2nd Prince of Clary and Aldringen
10. Karl Joseph, 3rd Prince of Clary and Aldringen
21. Princesse Christine of Ligne
5. Countess Léontine of Clary and Aldringen
22. Count Rudolf Chotek of Chotkowa and Wognin
11. Countess Luise Chotek of Chotkowa and Wognin
23. Countess Maria Sidonia of Clary and Aldringen
1. Janusz Radziwiłł
24. Prince Francis Xavier Sapieha-Kodenski
12. Paul, Prince Sapieha-Kodenski
25. Teresa Suffczynska
6. Prince Léon Sapieha-Kodenski
26. Count Stanislaw Feliks Potocki
13. Countess Pelagia Rosa Potocka
27. Countess Józefa Amalia Mniszechówna
3. Princess Pelagia Sapieha-Kodenska
7. Countess Johanna Tyszkiewicz
