= Michał Radziwiłł Rudy =

Polish noble (1870–1955)

- Born: Michał Władysław Karol Jan Alojzy Wilhelm Edmund Robert Michał Radziwiłł; 8 February 1870; Berlin
- Died: 6 October 1955 (aged 85); Santa Cruz de Tenerife
- Spouse(s): Maria Nikołajewna de Bernardaky (m. 1898; died 1915) Maria Henrietta Martinez de Medinilla de Santa-Susana (m. 1916; div. 1929) Harriet Dawson (m. 1938)
- Children: Antoni Radziwiłł; Leontyna Radziwiłł zam. hr. Skórzewska
- Parent(s): Ferdynand Radziwiłł; Pelagia Sapieha

Michał Radziwiłł Rudy (8 February 1870 – 6 October 1955 in Santa Cruz de Tenerife) was a nobleman and diplomat.

== Early life ==
He was born to Ferdynand Radziwiłł and Pelagia Sapieha on 8 February 1870 in Berlin. His great-grandfather was Prince Anton Radziwill and his great-grandmother was Princess Louise of Prussia (1770–1836). He was a member of the Radziwiłł family. The nickname "Rudy", or in Lithuanian "Rudasis", was a reference to the color of his brown (rudas) hair. His friends also called him "Munio", while his relatives often referred to him as just "the Renegade" or "the Degenerate". As a count (Hrabia) whose property was based around the village of Antonin he was also known, especially locally, as the "Maharaja of Antonin (the Przygodzice ordynacja)", due to his luxurious and excessive lifestyle.

He attained degrees in law and philosophy and worked as a diplomat in the embassy of the Russian Empire in Paris. He also served as a lieutenant colonel in the German and as a major in the British armies. He was involved in several major scandals which led to him being disowned by some members of his family.

== Career ==
He served as a diplomat in Russian service until the Russian Revolution in 1917, reputedly speaking eight languages. He served as a lieutenant colonel in the German army and as a major in the British army. He returned to the Second Polish Republic in 1926, assuming Polish citizenship that year.

His activities were a constant source of gossip for the interwar Polish and international press. After he was disinherited by his father, he tried to get back several properties through the Russian government (at that time, those properties were part of the Russian partition). Increasingly distanced from his family, at one point he sued his own father. He retained the Przygodzice ordynacja, which he brought to the brink of bankruptcy. He closed a family chapel in Antonin, causing a scandal when he attempted to remove some of his ancestors from their burial places in the chapel. Involved in numerous extramarital affairs, once he punched his first wife, throwing her out of a speeding car. One of his cousins, Krzysztof Radziwiłł, in his memoirs described him as a psychopath; many members of the family referred to him as "degenerate".

=== World War II ===
In 1939, on the outbreak of World War II, he is alleged to have attempted to appease the Nazi Germany occupiers by offering Antonin to Adolf Hitler. At that time, he also declared himself a German, and welcomed the invaders as "liberators".

After his divorce, Michał Radziwiłł had multiple debts and developed an addiction to gambling. When Hitler's army entered Poland Michał Radziwiłł hoped to enter the Volksliste (Nazi Party list classifying inhabitants of the German-occupied territories) and in order to do so, he delivered speeches promoting Polish surrender to the German army. Michał Radziwiłł also wanted to dislocate the family catacombs in the cellars of the Antonin property, and in 1939 is alleged to have offered the castle as the gift to Hitler.

This however failed to generate him enough good will with the new authorities, and he was put under house arrest. In 1940 he was allowed to emigrate to France, where he spent several months in the French Riviera. A new wave of scandals there only confirmed his bad reputation. He spent the remainder of World War II with relatives near Berlin and in Switzerland.

After the war, he settled in his second wife's estate in Tenerife, where he lived alone in increasing poverty until his death on 6 October 1955. He was also a Knight of Malta.

== Personal life ==
He married three times. He had two children from his first marriage to Maria Nikołajewna de Bernardaky (in 1898). That marriage caused controversy because Maria, a Greek aristocrat, was Eastern Orthodox, and the couple agreed to raise their children in that faith. His frequent beatings once resulted in Maria breaking her leg. He divorced her in 1915.

In 1916, he married his second wife, the widow Maria Henrietta Martinez de Medinilla de Santa-Susana. Later he got involved with a nurse Mary Atkinson who committed suicide. He attempted to divorce Maria Henrietta in 1929, but it was never finalized due to technical difficulties; the couple, however, separated. For that reason, his third marriage in 1938 to Harriet Stewart Dawson (the wealthy widow of an Australian businessman), was seen as possibly illegal, and caused him a new wave of legal problems and scandals.
