= Ferdynand Radziwiłł =

Polish-German politician

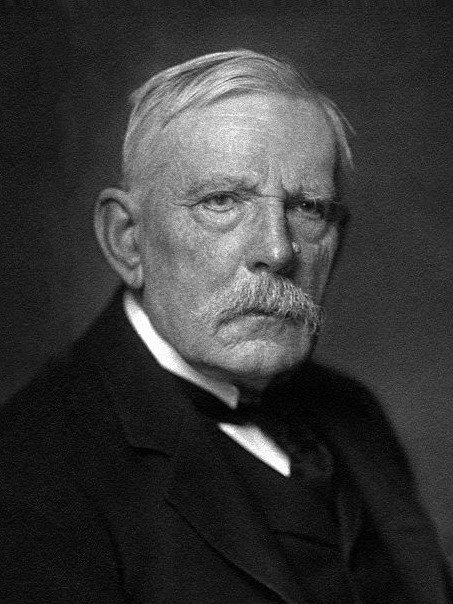
- Ferdynand Radziwiłł c. 1914
- Born: Ferdynand Fryderyk Radziwiłł; 19 October 1834; Berlin
- Died: 28 February 1926 (aged 91); Rome
- Spouse: Pelagia Sapieha (m. 1864)
- Children: with Pelagia Sapieha: Michał Władysław "Rudy" Radziwiłł; Zygmunt Radziwiłł; Karol Ferdynand Radziwiłł; Maria Malgorzata Radziwiłł; Janusz Franciszek Radziwiłł
- Parent(s): Bogusław Fryderyk Radziwiłł; Leontyna Gabriela Clary et Aldringen

Prince Ferdynand Fryderyk Radziwiłł (1834 in Berlin – 1926 in Rome) was a Polish nobleman and Polish-German politician.

== Early life ==
He was the son of Bogusław Fryderyk Radziwiłł and Leontyna von Clary und Aldringen. Through his paternal grandmother, Princess Louise of Prussia, he was a cousin of the German Emperors.

He was educated in Berlin and received a law degree.

== Career ==
During the Franco-Prussian War, he served as a soldier in the German army for one year.

For much of his life he lived in the German Empire, where he was a member of the German parliament (Reichstag) from 1874 to 1918. He was known as an important leader of the Polish minority and opponent of the Germanization and Kulturkampf policies.

Prior to 1885, his political concerns fell mostly with the relation of the Church to the Kulturkampf.

In 1901, he gave a speech at the Reichstag to protest the treatment of Polish school children in Września. In the speech, he denounced the alleged use of corporal punishment on children, noting that bonuses were paid to teachers who taught the most German. In response, Count von Bülow said that "foreign sentiments" could not influence domestic policy, and that Germans in the east will not "fall beneath Polish wheels." Bülow concluded by stating that efforts to bring about an independent Poland would be opposed.

In 1908, he spoke out against expropriations.

After Poland regained independence in 1918, he became a Polish citizen and a member of the Polish parliament (Sejm). His political activity ended in 1919.

In February 1926 he died in Rome.

== Family ==
He married Pelagia Sapiezanka in 1864. They had five children.

== Ancestry ==
Ancestors of Ferdynand Radziwiłł

16. Prince Marcin Mikołaj Radziwiłł
8. Prince Michał Hieronim Radziwiłł
17. Marta Trębicka
4. Prince Antoni Radziwiłł
18. Antoni Tadeusz Przeździecki
9. Helena Przeździecka
19. Katarzyna Ogińska
2. Prince Bogusław Fryderyk Radziwiłł
20. Frederick William I of Prussia
10. Prince Augustus Ferdinand of Prussia
21. Princess Sophia Dorothea of Hanover
5. Princess Louise of Prussia
22. Frederick William, Margrave of Brandenburg-Schwedt
11. Margravine Elisabeth Louise of Brandenburg-Schwedt
23. Princess Sophia Dorothea of Prussia
1. Ferdynand Radziwiłł
24. Franz Wenzel, 1st Prince of Clary and Aldringen
12. Johann, 2nd Prince of Clary and Aldringen
25. Countess Josepha of Hohenzollern-Hechingen
6. Karl Joseph, 3rd Prince of Clary and Aldringen
26. Charles-Joseph, 7th Prince of Ligne
13. Princesse Christine of Ligne
27. Princess Marie Franziska of Liechtenstein
3. Countess Léontine of Clary and Aldringen
28. Johann Karl, Count Chotek of Chotkow and Wognin
14. Johann Rudolf, Count Chotek of Chotkow and Wognin
29. Countess Anna Maria Kottulinsky of Kottulin and Krzizkowitz
7. Countess Luise Chotek of Chotkowa and Wognin
30. Franz Wenzel, 1st Prince of Clary and Aldringen (= 24)
15. Countess Maria Sidonia of Clary and Aldringen
31. Countess Josepha of Hohenzollern-Hechingen (= 25)
