= Austrian nobility =

Status group

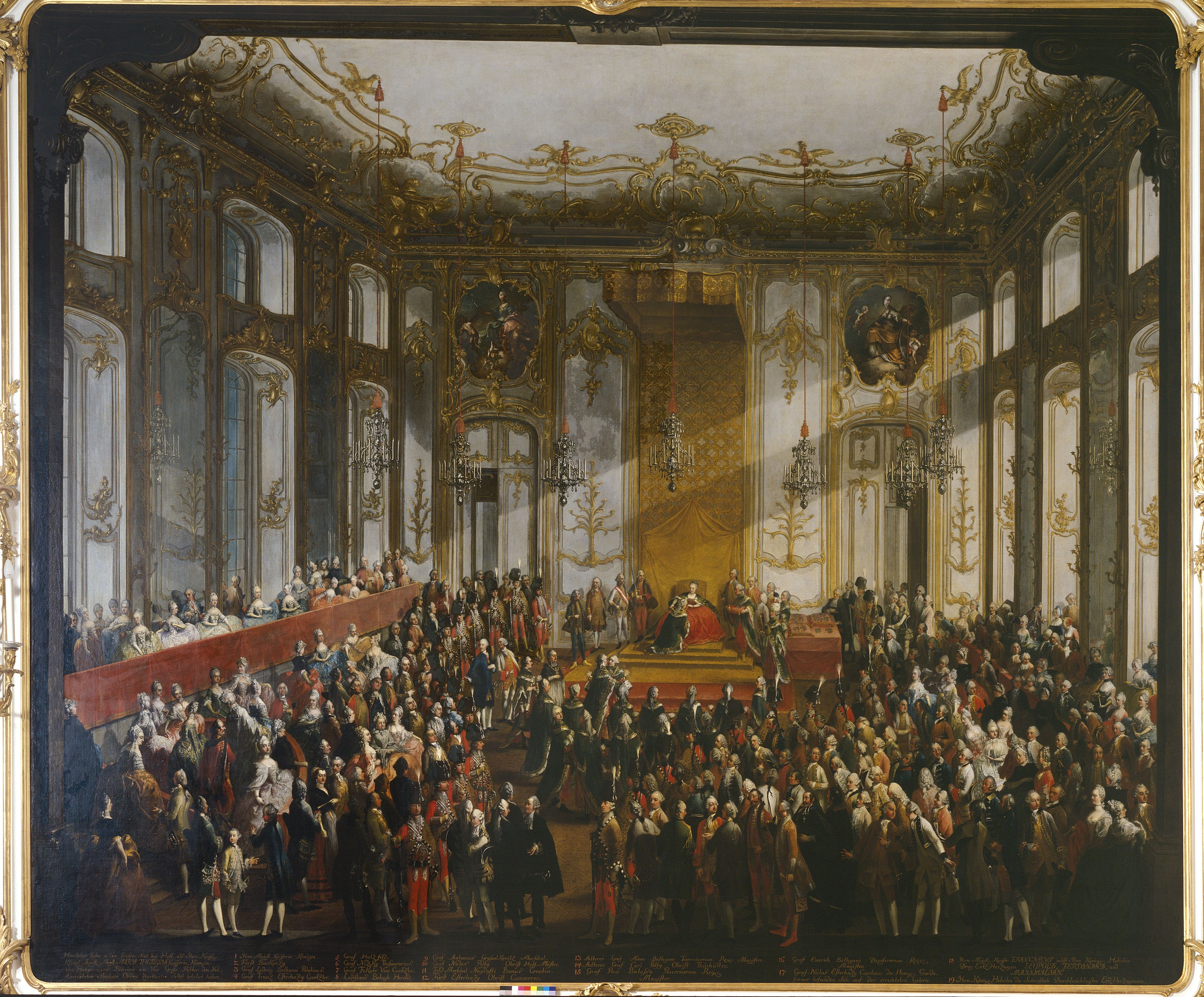
The imperial court of Maria Theresa at the Hofburg in Vienna

The Austrian nobility (German: österreichischer Adel) is a status group that was officially abolished in 1919 after the fall of Austria-Hungary. Austria's system of nobility was very similar to that of Germany (see German nobility), as both countries were previously part of the Holy Roman Empire (962–1806).

Any noble living in the Habsburg-ruled lands, and who owed allegiance to the dynasty and therefore to the emperor, was also considered part of the Austrian aristocracy. This applied to any member of the Bohemian, Hungarian, Polish, Croatian, and other nobilities in the Habsburg dominions. Attempting to differentiate between ethnicities can be difficult, especially for nobles during the eras of the Holy Roman Empire and the Austro-Hungarian monarchy (1867–1918). A noble from Galicia, for instance, such as the Count Jordan-Rozwadowski (see section "Noble titles" below under Graf/Gräfin (count/countess)), could call himself a Polish noble, but he also rightfully belonged to the Austrian nobility.

Two categories among the Austrian nobility may be distinguished: the historic nobility that lived in the territories of the Habsburg Empire and who owed allegiance to the head of that dynasty until 1918, and the post-1918 descendants of Austrian nobility—specifically, those who retain Austrian citizenship, whose family originally come from Austria proper, South Tyrol, northern Italy and Burgenland, or who were ennobled at any point under Habsburg rule and identify themselves as belonging to that status group.

== History ==
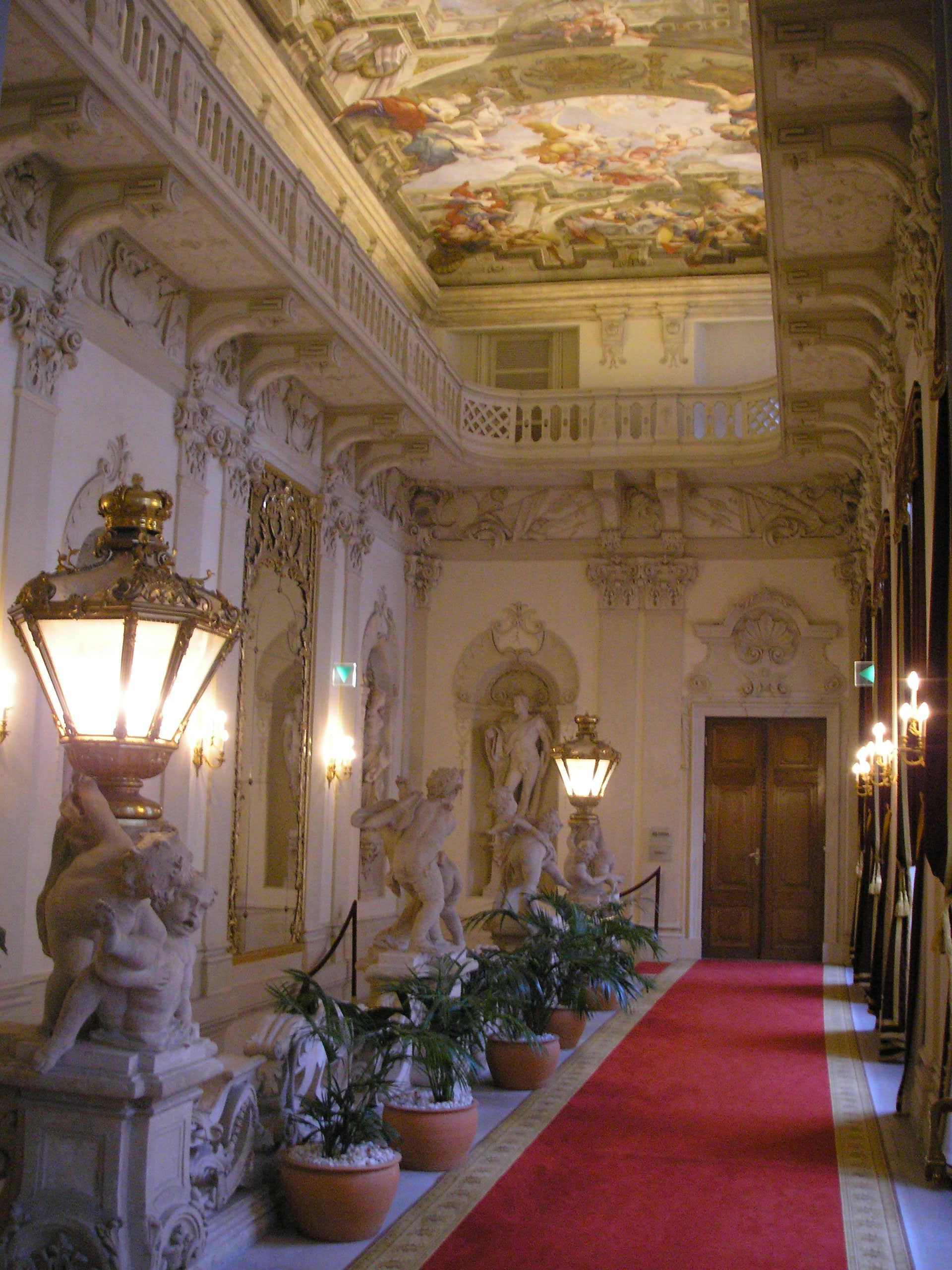
During the baroque era, the nobility started to move into the cities and built themselves lavish residences called Palais. The Palais Kinsky in Vienna, belonging to the princely Kinsky family, is one of the most outstanding pieces.

=== Imperial nobility ===
From 1453, the Archduke of Austria had the right to bestow titles and ranks upon non-nobles, as did the Archbishop of Salzburg, as Salzburg remained an independent territory. Besides the Holy Roman Emperor (an office which was almost uninterruptedly held by the Archduke (of the House of Habsburg) from 1438 to 1806), only a few territorial rulers within the Empire had this right. In an era of Absolutism, the nobility residing in the cities slowly turned itself into the court nobility (Hofadel). Service at the court became the primary goal of the nobility. This in turn initiated an interest in education and the interests of the court. Within the court, a close inner circle, called the 100 Familien (100 families), possessed enormous riches and lands. They also had great influence at the court and thus played an important role in politics and diplomacy.

After the end of the Holy Roman Empire in 1806, the Habsburg rulers, who were Emperors of Austria from 1804 onwards, continued to elevate individuals to nobility until the end of the monarchy in 1918. Some of the noble families even obtained the right to be seated in the Herrenhaus (House of Lords), the upper house of the Reichsrat (Imperial Council). Nobles from previously sovereign states such as those in northern Italy (Venice, Mantua, Milan) were also recognized by the authorities and were allowed to keep their titles and rights.

==== Burgenland ====
On the former status of nobility in Burgenland, which was part of the Kingdom of Hungary until 1921, see Hungarian nobility.

==== Jewish nobles ====
A few very wealthy Jewish families were ennobled after the Toleranzedikt vom 1782 ("1782 Edict of Tolerance") decreed by Emperor Joseph II. Under this Edict, very wealthy Jewish bankers, and later entrepreneurs and industrialists—some of them court Jews—could also be ennobled for their services. Jews had been ennobled mostly, as was common with all newly ennobled families, with lesser noble ranks, but also with peerages such as Freiherr (Baron). The few Jewish families elevated into the nobility were not required to forswear their faith, but some of these families converted to Christianity in order to become more accepted. Although elevation into the nobility meant recognition for civic contributions and services, and entailed a rise in social status, it did not alter the fact that Jews were, for the most part, still only "tolerated" at best. Jews could not freely choose the place and duration of their stay and had to regularly ask for permission from the authorities. This placed a huge burden on Jewish families; if the head of the family died, all his relatives had to leave the city. (Note: This was also often the case in Russia, for Jewish families who resided beyond the Pale of Settlement. However, unlike in Austria, this was never reformed and remained the case until the collapse of the Tsarist regime in 1917) The right to purchase real estate was forbidden to Jews, even if they belonged to the nobility. This regulation stayed in place until 1860, when it was abolished by Emperor Franz Joseph I and Jewish citizens were given equal rights. When the banker and protector of arts Raymund Karl Wetzler von Plankenstern was created a Reichsfreiherr (Baron of the Empire) by Empress Maria Theresia, he converted to Catholicism while still young. His mansion in Vienna was a center of the fine arts and he was a close friend of Mozart, as his son Alexander was of Ludwig van Beethoven.

Despite these difficulties, by 1821 there were at least eleven ennobled Jewish families living in Vienna alone: the Rothschild, Arnstein, Eskeles, Gomperz, Kuffner, Lieben, Auspitz, Schey von Koromla, Todesco, Goluchowski-Glochowsky, Wertheimstein, Weißmann and Wiernes families. In 1830 the Jewish von Neumann family were elevated into the nobility. The elevation into the nobility of wealthy Jews also started the process of assimilation of Jewish families into the Austrian upper class.

=== Abolition of nobility in 1919 ===
With the same date, the Habsburgergesetz of 1919 ("Habsburg Law"), which legally dethroned, exiled and confiscated the properties of the Imperial House of Habsburg, the Adelsaufhebungsgesetz (Arbitration Act) of 3 April 1919 ("Law on the Abolition of Nobility") abolished nobility as well as all noble privileges, titles and names in Austria. In other monarchies of Europe, Austrian noble families may use their noble titles as well as nobiliary particles such as von and zu in their names and they still retain noble status there.

This may sometimes be confusing, as descendants of nobles are sometimes referred to with noble names abroad. Also, members of noble families often hold multiple citizenships, as was the case for Otto von Habsburg (eldest son of the last Emperor of Austria-Hungary and father of Karl Habsburg-Lothringen), who was also a citizen of Germany. The Austrian law does not apply to artistic, performer or stage names, where von is sometimes used, as in the case of musician Hubert von Goisern. However, stage names are never recognized for official purposes.

Members of the lower nobility especially (such as civil servants) found this radical step of abolition degrading and humiliating, since working towards and finally earning a noble title was a way for them and their families to rise within society. Members of the higher nobility were able to absorb the formal abolition more easily. They lost their titles and privileges, but kept their social networks, manners, standing and riches. Federal President Michael Hainisch called the official abolition

...childish, because it did not hit those that it was supposed to hit. I once talked to the very fine and very intelligent Princess Fanny Starhemberg about this. "To us," she said, "the official abolition is quite irrelevant, because with or without the titles, we will always remain the Starhembergs."

The law abolishing nobility and titles was never repealed, even during the period of Austrofascism (1934–1938). Following the Anschluss to Nazi Germany (1938–1945), this law remained on the books, although it was not enforced, allowing Austrian nobles to use titles freely again.

== Current status ==
Although noble titles and the particles von and zu are no longer legal, some persons are still unofficially referred to by their titles. For example, the late Karl Schwarzenberg was occasionally still referred to as Fürst zu Schwarzenberg (Prince zu Schwarzenberg) in the media; he held Czech and Swiss citizenship, not Austrian.

Unlike the nobility in Bohemia (Czechoslovakia), Poland, Russia, or the former Prussian territories, the Austrian nobility never had its lands and riches confiscated in Austria (except the Imperial House of Habsburg, which had its properties legally confiscated by the Austrian republican government on 3 April 1919, through the Habsburg Law). Social measures were introduced by the republican government in order to create more equality amongst the citizens and finance public projects, which put a strain on the traditional land-holding gentry and aristocracy, resulting in the forced sale of many palaces and lands due to the expense of their upkeep. However, there was no measure by the government specifically to target nobility and take away their possessions.

Still, the nobility today are sometimes nonetheless treated slightly differently from other citizens. Austrian nobility still plays a large part in movies made after World War II (for example, Sissi and The Sound of Music), and is still featured regularly in the media and literature. The social events of nobles are still covered extensively in tabloids.

Apart from the prohibition of their titles, some former nobles still make up some of the richest families in Austria, such as the Esterházy, Mayr-Melnhof and Mautner-Markhof. Many members of the Austrian nobility today work in the traditional fields of diplomacy, politics, have business and financial interests, or are philanthropists or socialites.

It was estimated that there were about 20,000 Austrian nobles in 2005. That year, an association was founded, the Vereinigung der Edelleute in Österreich (Association of Austrian Nobles, or V.E.Ö.), which sees itself as the successor of the Vereinigung katholischer Edelleute in Österreich (Catholic Association of Austrian Nobles, or V.E.Ö.), founded in 1922 but banned under the Nazis in 1938. This was challenged under the Nobility Abolition Act.

== Categories of nobility ==
Austria's nobility was divided into three categories: the mediatized nobility (standesherrlicht), the higher nobility (hoher Adel), and the lower nobility (niederer Adel):

=== Non-ruling members of the imperial family ===
Non-ruling members of the imperial family held various titles:

- The wife of the emperor (Kaiser) bore the title of empress (Kaiserin) and was styled Her Imperial Majesty;
- Agnates of the imperial family and their authorized wives bore the title of archduke/archduchess (Erzherzog/Erzherzogin) and styled Imperial and Royal Highness (Kaiserliche und königliche Hoheit).

Legitimate but morganatic descendants of the imperial family were excluded from the line of succession, but might sometimes receive lesser titles with noble rather than royal prerogatives, e.g.:

- Prince von Hohenberg, later further created duke (Herzog) and styled Highness (Hoheit);
- Prince von Montenuovo;
- Duke of Reichstadt;
- Margrave von Burgau;
- Count von Meran.

=== Titles of mediatized nobility ===
(English titles with German equivalents)

- Prince/Princess of the Holy Roman Empire (Reichsfürst/Reichsfürstin)^{1}
- Imperial Count/Countess (Reichsgraf/Reichsgräfin)

^1 A title with the prefix Reichs- indicates its being granted by a past Holy Roman Emperor, ranking above other titles of the same or higher nominal rank.

=== Titles of higher nobility ===
(English titles with German equivalents)

Arms of the Princes of Schwarzenberg

- Prince/Princess (Fürst/Fürstin)
- Margrave/Margravine (Markgraf/Markgräfin)
- Count/Countess (Graf/Gräfin)

=== Titles of lower nobility ===
(English titles with German equivalents)

- Baron/Baroness (Freiherr/Freifrau and Freiin)^{2}
- Knight (Ritter) (no female version existed)
- Edler/Edle

^2 In German, a distinction between baronesses exists, a Freifrau being a baroness by marriage and Freiin being a baroness by birth. The title of Ritter is equivalent to the British baronet (i.e., hereditary knight), and Edler means "noble".

Use of nobiliary particles, such as the prepositions "von", "zu", variations such as "van" and "vom", or combinations ("von und zu"), common until after World War I (non-German-speaking nobility preferred to use "de"), were also banned by the 1919 Law on the Abolition of Nobility.

== Titles of nobility ==
Below is an incomplete list of Austrian noble families, listed by rank of title. Note that some members of a family were sometimes given higher titles by the emperor because of merit. Titles, styles, and rights could only be conferred by the monarch. In some cases, they could even be revoked because of fall from favour.

=== Fürst/Fürstin (prince/princess) ===
The style of address was usually "Serene Highness" (Durchlaucht) or the lower style of "Princely Grace" (Fürstliche Gnaden). Although Herzog ("duke") was officially a higher title than Fürst, the former was rare in Austria, except among sovereign and mediatized houses (e.g., the House of Liechtenstein as Herzog von Jägerndorf und Troppau, and the House of Croÿ as Herzog von Croÿ). The princely title was the most prestigious of the Austrian nobility, usually borne by heads of families whose cadets were generally counts/countesses, although in some mediatized princely families (Reichsfürsten) members were allowed to bear the same title as cadets of royalty: prince/princess (Prinz/Prinzessin) with the style of Serene Highness.

Preposition (Note: Where this section is blank, it is possible that the preposition is unknown or did not exist.)	Original name	Most called	Notes
von	Auersperg		head of this family also carries the titles of Duke of Gottschee, Princely Count of Wels. All members are Serene Highnesses, Princes(ses) of Auersperg
	Batthyány-Strattmann		junior members were counts
von	Clary und Aldringen	Clary-Aldringen	junior members were counts
von	Collalto und San Salvatore	Collalto	junior members were counts
von	Colloredo-Mansfeld	Colloredo-Mansfeld	junior members were counts; eldest son of the prince was titled Count of Mansfeld; see also House of Mansfeld
von	Croÿ	Croÿ-(subline)	also known as Croÿ-Dülmen, three branches exist. Heads of this family were dukes; also used the preposition de.
von	Dietrichstein		became extinct firstly in male line, recreated for husband of heiress; junior members of this family were counts von Dietrichstein & Proskau-Leslie (first family) then Dietrichstein-Mensdorff-Pouilly (second family)
von	Eggenberg		became extinct firstly in male line, Bohemian possessions passed to the nearest male relatives via marriage, the Schwarzenberg family, and Styrian possessions likewise to the Herberstein family.
de	Esterházy von Galántha	Esterházy	also comital; also used the preposition de
	Festetics von Tolna	Festetics	also comital; also used the preposition de
zu	Fürstenberg	Fürstenberg	members use titles outside of Austria; some use the preposition von
von	Grassalkovich	Grassalkovich	became extinct
von	Hohenberg		title of Fürst for all members; elevated to ducal status by primogeniture in 1917
zu	Hohenlohe	Hohenlohe-(subline)	this family had multiple branches
von	Khevenhüller-Metsch	Khevenhüller-Metsch	junior members were counts
	Kinsky von Wchinitz und Tettau	Kinsky	junior members were counts; also comital
von	Koháry	Saxe-Coburg and Gotha-Koháry	also comital; became extinct firstly in male line, possessions passed to the Saxe-Coburg and Gotha branch of the family via marriage to the heiress of the last prince
von	Lamberg		junior members were counts
von	Lichnowsky		
von	Lobkowicz	Lobkowicz	
von und zu	Liechtenstein	Liechtenstein	sovereign since 1719
von	Metternich-Winneburg	Metternich	also used the preposition de; became extinct
von	Montenuovo		see also House of Neipperg
zu	Oettingen-Oettingen		this family had multiple branches (Oettingen, Wallerstein & Spielberg)
von	Orsini und Rosenberg	Orsini-Rosenberg	junior members were counts
von	Rohan	Rohan	head of this family was ducal; also used the preposition de
zu	Sayn-Wittgenstein	Sayn-Wittgenstein-(subline)	this family had multiple branches
von	Schönburg	Schönburg-(subline)	this family had multiple branches (Hartenstein & Waldenburg); also comital
von	Starhemberg	Starhemberg	junior members were counts
(von und) zu	Schwarzenberg	Schwarzenberg	Head of House carries also the titles of Duke of Krumlov, Princely Landgrave of Klettgau and Count of Sulz. All members are Serene Highnesses, Princes(ses) of Schwarzenberg, Counts of Sulz and Landgraves of Klettgau.
von	Thun-Hohenstein	Thun-Hohenstein	also comital
von und zu	Trauttmansdorff-Weinsberg	Trauttmansdorff-Weinsberg	also comital
von	Waldburg	Waldburg-(subline)	this family had multiple branches; junior members were counts
zu	Windisch-Graetz	Windisch-Graetz	also Windisch-Grätz

=== Markgraf/Markgräfin (margrave/margravine) ===
- Csáky-Pallavicini
- Pallavicini

=== Graf/Gräfin (count/countess) ===
Mediatized counts were often entitled to the style of "Illustrious Highness" (Erlaucht). Ranking below them were the comital families of ancient lineage, wealth and influence who were recognized as such in Austria, but had not been Counts of the Empire (Reichsgrafen) prior to 1806; these counts bore the lower style of "High-born" (Hochgeboren).

- (von Abensberg und Traun) Abensberg-Traun
- Aichelburg (or Aichelburg-Zossenegg)
- (Alberti von Enno)
- Almásy
- Almeida
- (von) Althann
- (von Andechs-Meranien) extinct 1248
- Andrassy
- Apponyi
- Arco
- Arz-Vasegg
- (von) Attems (or Attems-Gilleis)
- (Bartolotti von Partenfeld)
- (Barth von Barthenheim), or de Bart(-Barthenheim), with title Reichsgraf since 2 December 1802
- Badeni
- Baillet (de Latour)
- Baldasseroni
- Bánffy (von Losontz)
- Bakowski/Bonkowski (von Bakow und Zaborow)
- Barbo von Waxenstein
- Beck (or Beck-Rzikowsy)
- Belcredi
- Béldi
- Bellegarde
- Belrupt-Tissac
- Benigni
- Berchtold
- Berenyi
- Bethlen
- Blanckenstein
- Bolza
- Bona
- Bonda (House of Bonda)
- Borkowski
- Bossi-Fedrigotti
- Bozen (see Maurer)
- Braida
- Brandis
- (von Breuner-Asparn) extinct 1894
- (von Breuner-Nußdorf) extinct 1862
- Breunner
- Brivio von Brokles
- Bubna-Litic
- Bucquoi (von Longueval)
- (Bukuwky von Bukuwka)
- Bulgarini
- (von) Buol-Schauenstein
- Butler (von Clonebough)
- (von) Caboga (House of Caboga)
- Calice
- (von Caprara)
- Cassis-Faraone
- (von) Cavriani
- (Ceschi a Santa Croce)
- (von) Chorinsky
- Chotek (von Chotkova (Chotkowa) und Wognin)
- Christalnigg
- Clam-Gallas
- Clam-Martinic
- (von) Clary-Aldringen
- Cobenzl
- (von Collalto und San Salvatore) Collalto
- (von) Colloredo-Mannsfeld
- Comini edler von Sonnenberg (Schlern, 1948)
- Consolati (Consolati von und zu Heiligenbrunn)
- Coreth (zu Coredo und Starkenberg)
- Coronini-Cronberg
- (von) Coudenhove-Kalergi
- Csák (von Köröszegh)
- Csáky (von Köröszegh und Adorján)-(von) Pallavicini also with the title Margrave (Markgraf, Őrgróf)
- Cseszneky de Milvány
- Czernin (von und zu Chudenitz)
- Cziraky
- D'Alton
- Daun
- Décsey (de Maros-Décse et Nagy-Doba)
- Degenfeld-Schonburg
- Des Fours
- Deym-Stritez
- Dezasse (de Petit-Verneuil)
- (von Dietrichstein)
- Dobrzensky (von Dobrzenicz)
- Dohalsky (von Dohalitz)
- Drašković (von Trakostjan or Draskovich de Trakostjan (Trakošćan))
- Dubsky (von Trebomislyc)
- Edelsheim-Gyulai
- Eltz (zu Eltz)
- Emo (-Capodilista)
- (von) Enzenberg
- (von) Erdödy
- (von Eppan) extinct 1248
- (von Eppensteiner) extinct 1122
- (von Eyczing) extinct 1620
- (Vrints zu Falkenstein)
- Falkenhayn
- Ferrari(s)-Ochieppo
- Festetics de Tolne
- von Ficquelmont
- Finck von Finckenstein
- (von) Firmian
- Folliot de Crenneville-(Poutet)
- Forni
- Francken-Sierstorpff
- von Frankenegg
- Fredro
- Fries
- Fünfkirchen
- Gallenberg
- Galler
- Gatterburg
- (von) Ghetaldi-Gondola
- Gleispach
- (von) Goëss
- Goluchowski-Glochowsky
- Gorcey
- Grabowki-Kruska
- Grimani-Giustinian
- Grundemann-Falkenberg
- (von Grünne), also carried title Graf von Pinchard
- (von) Gudenus
- Hadik (von Futak)
- (zu) Hardegg
- (de la Fontaine und d'Harnoncourt-Unverzagt) Harnoncourt
- (von Harrach zu Rohrau und Thannhausen) Harrach
- Hartenau
- Hartig
- Haslingen
- (Henckel von Donnersmarck)
- (von Herberstein)
- (von) Hohenems
- (von) Hoyos
- Hunyady-Kethely
- Huyn
- Idrányi
- Jakoff
- Kálnoky
- Károlyi
- von Kramer – or Erbgrafen und Herren von Kramer since 1525
- (von Krismerhof) Krismer
- (von Kaszongi)
- (von) Kaunitz
- (von) Kellersberg
- (von) Keyserling
- (von) Khevenhüller or Khevenhüller-Metsch
- Kinsky (von Wchinitz und Tettau), also princely with the title of Fürst
- (von) Kuefstein
- (Klenowsky von Klenau und Janowitz)
- (von) Kollonitsch
- (von) Kolowrat
- (von) Kolowrat-Krakowsky
- (von Kolowrat-Liebsteinsky) extinct 1861
- (Königsegg zu Aulendorf)
- Kornis
- Kottulinsky (von Kottulin)
- (von) Krane
- (von)Kruska-Grabowski
- Khuen-Belasi
- (von) Kuefstein
- Küenburg
- Künigl
- Kulmer (zum Rosenpichl und Hohenstein)
- (von) Kurzberg
- (von) Lamberg
- Lanckoronski
- Lanthieri
- Larisch (zu Moennich)
- Laskiewicz von Friedensfeld
- Lazanski (von Bukowa)
- Ledóchowski (a.k.a. Halka von Ledóchow-Ledóchowski)
- Lexa (von Aehrenthal)
- Lodron-Laterano
- Lodron-Löwenstein
- Ludwigstorff
- (MacCaffry of Kean More)
- Magni
- Mailáth
- Mamming
- Marenzi, also with title Margrave (Markgraf)
- Marzani
- Mattner later associated to Vanderbilt
- Matuschka
- Maurer (1919: Mauriello)
- Mels-Colloredo
- (von) Mensdorff-Pouilly, also princely with the title of Fürst (Mensdorff-Pouilly-Dietrichstein)
- Meran
- Meraviglia-Crivelli
- (von) Mesko
- Migazzi
- Mikes Mikes de Zabola
- (von Mir)
- Mittrowsky
- Montecuccoli
- (von Montfort) extinct 1787
- (von) Neipperg, title of Fürst von Montenuovo granted to illegitimate line
- Neuhaus
- (von Norman und von Audenhove) Norman-Audenhove
- Nostitz-Rieneck
- Nyary (von Bedegh und Berench)
- Oeynhausen
- O'Donnell von Tyrconnell
- O'Dwyer (Oduyer)
- Oppersdorff
- (Orsini und Rosenberg) Orsini-Rosenberg, also princely with the title of Fürst
- Orssich (de Slatevich)
- Osiecimski-Hutten-Csapski
- Ostrowski
- Paar
- Pace
- Pacata
- (Pálffy von Erdöd) Pálffy
- (von) Pallavicini, also with title of Margrave (Markgraf)
- Pasquali
- Paumgarten
- Pejacsevich (Pejačević)
- Piatti
- Pilati
- Podstatzky-Lichtenstein
- (von) Pola (de Castropola)
- Pötting und Persing
- Potulicki
- Pozza von Zagorien (House of Pozza)
- von Pranckh zu Pux
- Praschma
- Prokesch-Osten
- (von) Puff
- Puppi
- Radetzky
- Rességuier
- Revertera (or Revertera-Salandra)
- Ražman
- (von) Rohrbacher
- (Jordan)-Rozwadowski (a Polish/Galician title)
- Rumerskirch
- Salburg
- Salis
- von Sammern
- von Sammern und Frankenegg
- (Sanchez) de la Cerda
- Saurma
- Scapinelli-Lèguigno
- Schallenberg (or Schallenberg-Krassl)
- Schirndinger (von Schirnding)
- Schnitzer
- Schmettow
- (von) Schönborn (or Schönborn-Bucheim)
- Schönfeld(t)
- Schwarzbauer
- Sedlnitzky-Odrowaz (cf. Sedlnitzky)
- Ségur-Cabanac
- Seiler
- Seilern-Aspang
- Serényi
- Sermage
- Siemienski-Lewicki
- Sierakowski
- (de Sylva von Tarouca, or de Silva-Tarouca) Silva-Tarouca
- Sizzo-Noris
- Skarbek
- Somogyi (von Medgyes)
- Spangen von Uyternesse
- Spannocchi
- Spaur
- Spee
- (Matz von) Spiegelfeld
- Sprinzenstein
- Stainach
- Starhemberg
- Sternberg
- (von) Sterzinger
- Stolberg
- Stras(s)oldo
- (von) Strozzi
- (Stubenberg family) extinct 1868
- Stubick
- Stürgkh
- Széchényi
- Taaffe
- Taczanowski (or Dassanowsky; Prussian title but long present in Galicia and Vienna)
- Tarnowski
- Tattenbach
- Taxis-Bordogna
- Teleki (von Szek)
- Terlago
- (von) Teuffenbach
- (von Thonradel) fled 1620
- (von) Thürheim
- (von) Thun-Hohenstein, also princely with the title of Fürst
- Thurn-Valsassina
- Tisza (de Boros-Jenö et Szeged)
- Török (de Szendrö)
- Traun
- (von und zu) Trauttmansdorff-Weinsberg, carried title of Erbgraf
- (von) Trautson
- (von der) Trenck
- Treuberg
- Ueberacker
- Ugrinovics
- (Ungnad von Weißenwolff)
- Ursini von Blagay
- Vay (von Vaja), Hungarian: Vajai Vay
- (Vetter von der Lilie)
- Wagensperg
- Waldburg(-Zeil-Trauchberg)
- Walderdorff
- Waldstein (or Waldstein-Wartenberg)
- (von Wallis), also carried title Freiherr auf Carighmain
- Walterskirchen, also carried title Freiherr zu Wolfsthal
- (von) Wédler
- Weikersheim
- Welczeck
- (Welser von) Welsersheimb
- Welsperg
- Wenckheim
- Wengersky
- Wickenburg
- Widmann-Sedlnitzky
- (von) Wilczek
- (von) Wimpffen
- (von) Wodzicki
- Wolanski
- Wolkenstein
- Wratislaw von Mitrowitz
- (von) Wurmbrand(-Stuppach)
- Wydenbruck
- Zaleski
- Zamoyski
- (von) Zichy(-Ferraris)
- Zierotin
- (von) Zinzendorf

=== Freiherr/Freifrau/Freiin (baron/baroness) ===
There was no official style, but "Gnädiger Herr" (Gracious Lord), "Gnädige Frau", or "Gnädiges Fräulein" (Gracious Lady) were common forms of address. Although strictly speaking the title was Freiherr, the usage of "Baron" in written and verbal communication was very common, even if incorrect. The title Freiin was also often replaced for "geborene (née) Baronin", which was strictly speaking also incorrect since a Baronin would have been married already.

- von Hochgötz
- Abele von Lilienberg
- Adamovich (de Csepin)
- (von) Arnstein
- Apfaltern
- (Arz von Straussenburg)
- (von) Augustin
- (von) Auspitz
- (von Bach)
- (von) Block
- Bakonyi
- (von) Baselli
- (Berger-Waldenegg)
- Berlakovich
- (von) Bibra
- (von Bienerth)
- Blomberg
- (von) Blumencron
- von Cavallar
- Chledowski (von) Pfaffenhofen
- (von Columbus)
- (von) Cornaro
- Cseszneky de Milvány
- Di Pauli von Treuheim
- (von) Drasche-Wartinberg
- Eötvös de Vásárosnamény
- (von) Eskeles
- (von) Ferstl
- Fraydt (von) Fraydenegg
- (von Fries)
- (von) Froelichsthal (or von Frölichsthal)
- (von Gagern)
- (von) Gomperz
- (von Ghetaldi-Gondola)
- (von) Haas
- (von) Hagenauer
- (von) Helfert
- (von) Hess
- (von In der Maur auf Strelburg und zu Freifeld)
- (von Hofkirchen) extinct 1692
- (von Isbary)
- (Jörger von Tollet) extinct 1772
- Janowsky von Janowitz und Klenau
- (von Marguti)
- (Kalchegger von Kalchberg)
- (Kay von Bebenburg)
- (Kiß von Ittebe)
- (von) Königswarter
- (von) Kubinzky
- (von) Klimburg
- (von Krismerhof) Krismer
- (von) Kuffner
- (Laube von Laubenfels)
- (von) Laudon
- (von) Leitenberger
- (Leonhardi)
- (von) Lieben
- (von) Ludwigstorff
- (von) Lütgendorff
- (von Manndorff zu Pfannhofen und Wissenau) Manndorff
- Matz von Spiegelfeld
- (Mayr von Melnhof) Mayr-Melnhof
- (von) Mens(s)hengen
- Milutinovich-Milovski
- von und zu Munding auf Stazen
- (Nadherny von Borutin)
- (Nagy von Töbör-Ethe)
- von Neszmery
- von Neumann
- Obenaus von Felsöház
- O'Connell, Moritz, Baron von O'Connell
- (von) Oppenheimer
- (Parish von Senftenberg)
- (von) Pereira-Arnstein (cf. Pereira, Arnstein)
- (von) Pfanzelter
- Anton von Poljak (Croatia)
- (von Prandau)
- (von Pucher) (zu Meggenhausen Reichenberg Kadau und Zwölfaxing)
- (von) Quiqueran-Beaujeu
- Reitzes
- (von) Reylander, normally used the title Baron
- (von) Riefel
- von Ripperda
- (von) Rona
- (von or de) Rothschild, normally used the title Baron
- (von) Ringhoffer
- (von) Scheer
- (von) Schey
- (von) Schneeburg
- (von) Schneeburg zu Salthaus
- Sankt Johann von Sütsch
- Schmeltzern (von) Wildmannsek (See Die Gothaischen Genalogischen Taschenbucher des Adels)
- (Schey von Koromla)
- (Sebottendorf von der Ronse)
- (von) Seiller
- (von) Silber
- (von) Sina
- (von Skrbensky)
- (von Schnehen)
- (von) Schmeltzern
- (von) Smeltzern zu Wildemannsek
- (von) Smeltzern Wildemannsek
- (von) Spaun
- (von) Staudach zu Freyenthurn und Ehrenegg
- (von) Sterzinger
- (von) Stipsicz de Ternova
- (zu) Stübing
- Sypniewski, Ritter von Odrowaz (1480)
- Thavonat-Thavon
- von Trautenegg
- von Tschugguel
- Thyssen-Bornemisza de Kászon
- (von) Todesco
- (von) Turkovich
- Wadenstierna
- (Jäger von) Waldau
- (von) Waechter
- Wetzler von Plankenstern\
- (Werner von Krismerhof) Werner
- (Wagner von Wehrborn)
- (von Widmann)
- (von) Wiernes
- (von) Wildmannsek, Schmeltzern
- (von Weigelsperg)
- (von) Wertheim, normally used the title "Baron"
- (von) Wertheimstein
- (von) Westenholz
- (Zeidler-Daublebsky von Sterneck)
- (von Zopf)

=== Ritter (knight) ===
There was no official style, but "Gnädiger Herr" was a common form of address. The title was for males only; no female version existed. Female members of a family with the title Ritter however were often addressed as "Edle von", which was incorrect unless the family already carried the Edler honour before being raised to the Ritter class.

- Beranek (von Bernhorst), ennobled in 1866
- Bloch (von Brodnegg), ennobled in 1915
- (von Brasseur)
- Cavallar von Grabensprung
- (von) Ephrussi
- (von) Epstein
- (von) Doderer
- (von) Gerstenbrand
- (von) Ghega
- von Graben von Stein
- (von Grumpenberger)
- (von) Gutmann
- Hackinger (von Hacking)
- (von Hauslab)
- (Hanisch von Greifenthal, Ritter von Reyl)
- (von Jurnitschek von Wehrstedt, Alfred, Ritter)
- (Kamauff)
- (von) Karajan
- (von) Klinkosch
- (Korybut de Ostoja)
- (von Kriegelstein), carried the title Reichsritter as well as Edler von Sternfeld
- (La Rénotiere, Ritter von Kriegsfeld)
- (von Klaudy)
- (von Kriehuber)
- Lakhner von Lakhnern
- Launsky (von Tieffenthal)
- (von) Leeb
- (von) Mallmann
- (von) Wildemannsek, Schmeltzern
- (von) Maurer (also Mauerer)
- (Mautner von Markhof) Mautner-Markhof
- (von) Merkl
- (von Miller zu Aichholz) Miller-Aichholz
- (von) Mulwerth
- (von)
- (von) Nadherny, Czech: Nádherný
- (von Nahujowski)
- (von Neumann)
- (von Odrowaz) Polish: Odrowąż
- (von) Ofenheim
- (von) Pellendorf
- (von Premerstein)
- (Friedmann, Ritter von) Prawy
- (Raus von Rausenbach) Also princely: Príncipe Raus, Duque de Rausenbach (Mexico, 1822)
- (von Rumpler)
- (von Schmelzing und Wernstein) (von) Schmelzing
- (de) Schneider de Zajol (Zajoli Schneider/Zajoli Snajder)
- (Schönwies von) Schönowsky
- (von Schwarz)
- (Skrebeciowicz de Sielecki, or von Sielecki) Sielecki
- (Stermich von Valcrociata or von Kreuzenthal) de Stermich di Valcrociata: also carries the title of Edler von Valrociata or von Kreuzenthal
- (von) Stross
- (von Sypniewski)
- (von) Trapp
- (von) Trautenegg
- (Visentin)
- de Weryha-Wysoczański
- (von) Winiwarter
- (von) Wessely, later Freiherr
- Pindter von Pindershoffen, later (von) Pintershofen, (von) Pindtershofen, di Pintershofen

=== Edler/Edle ===
The rank of Edler carried no official style, but "Gnädiger Herr" or "Gnädige Frau" were common forms of address.

- von Baumgarten
- Beer von Schlatt auf Kürnburg
- (Fedrigoni von Etschthal)
- (von Günner)
- (Hanisch von Greifenthal)
- (Helff-Hibler von Alpenheim)
- Hofmann von Hofmannsthal
- (von) Holzmeister
- (von) Khol
- (von Korbuss)
- (Kyd von Rebenburg)
- (Milutinowits von Gottesheim)
- (von) Mises
- (von Montalmar)
- (von Nespern)
- (Schallber von Schalberg)
- (von Schuppler)
- (Sepp von Seppenburg)
- (von Sternfeld), also carried the title Reichsritter von Kriegelstein
- (von) Sypniewski, also carried the title "Baron Sypniewski"
- (von Tanzi), also carried the title Graf Tanzi-Blevio
- Tarbuk von Sensenhorst
- (von) Thurneyssen
- Treutler von Traubenberg, often styled as "Treutler de Traubenberg"
- Visentin- Vicentin- visitin,
- (von) Webenau
- (von) Weingartner
- Welzl von Wellenheim

=== Erbsälzer ===
This title belonged to the patricians of the free city of Werl, in Germany, who had the hereditary (erb-) right to exploit the nearby salt mines (salz). Thus this title was not granted in Austria, but merely recognized there.

- (von) Lilien
- (von) Papen

== Untitled noble families or status unknown ==
- (Anthony von Siegenfeld)
- (von) Adlgasser
- (Balog von Manko Bück)
- (von) Benda
- (von Berke)
- Bielka-Karlstreu
- (von Brenner)
- (von Binder) or Binder
- (von or de) Chledowski
- (von) Doblhoff
- (Dobner von Dobenau)
- (von) Eidlitz
- (von) Einem
- (von Ernst)
- (Fenrich) Fenrich-Ochsenreitter
- (von Fischer)
- (Fischer von See)
- (Froschmayr von Scheiblenhof)
- (von Fürstenmühl)
- (von) Gaupp
- (von) Gauster-Filek
- (Gelb von Siegesstern)
- (von) Gera
- (von Göhausen)
- (von Greschke)
- (Grognet d'Orleans)
- (von Hellenau)
- (von) Holbein
- (von) Hornbostel
- Jakabffy (von Nemeshetes und Zaguzsen)
- (von Keren)
- (Korper von Marienwert)
- (von Lambort)
- (von Leiding)
- (von) Lennkh
- (Levasori della Motta)
- (Lippich von Lindburg)
- (von) Lónyay (Hungarian Count Elémer Lónyay married Archduchess Stephanie, widow of Crown Prince Rudolf, and was elevated to prince (Fürst))
- (von Löwenthal-Linau)
- (von) Mlaker
- Müller-Hartburg
- (von) Neumann
- (Oreskovich von Breithen-Thurn)
- (von Pechmann)
- (von) Prausnitz
- (von Praxenthaler)
- (von Preradovic), Croatian: Preradović
- (von) Radak
- (von Remenyik), Hungarian: Reményik
- (von) Rigel
- (von) Rottal
- (von) Saar
- (de) Saeger (since 1731)
- (de Schaller)
- Schiff (von Suvero)
- (von) Scholten
- (Schönburg-de Laserna)
- Schumacher (von Marienfrid)
- (von) Strachwitz (the German Franz Graf (Count) Strachwitz von Groß-Zauche und Camminetz gained Austrian citizenship without having to eliminate his title or the "von")
- (von Stremnitzberg)
- (Suchy von Weißenfeld)
- (Toscano dell Banner)
- von Tothfalussy
- (Tuschner von Hirschberg)
- (von Ürmenyi), Hungarian: Ürményi
- (von Wagner)
- (von) Zengler
- (von Zepharovich, Zepharovich)
- (von) Zumbusch
- (Zeßner-Spitzenberg)
- Hartung von Hartungen
- (von Prokopovitsch)

== Gallery ==
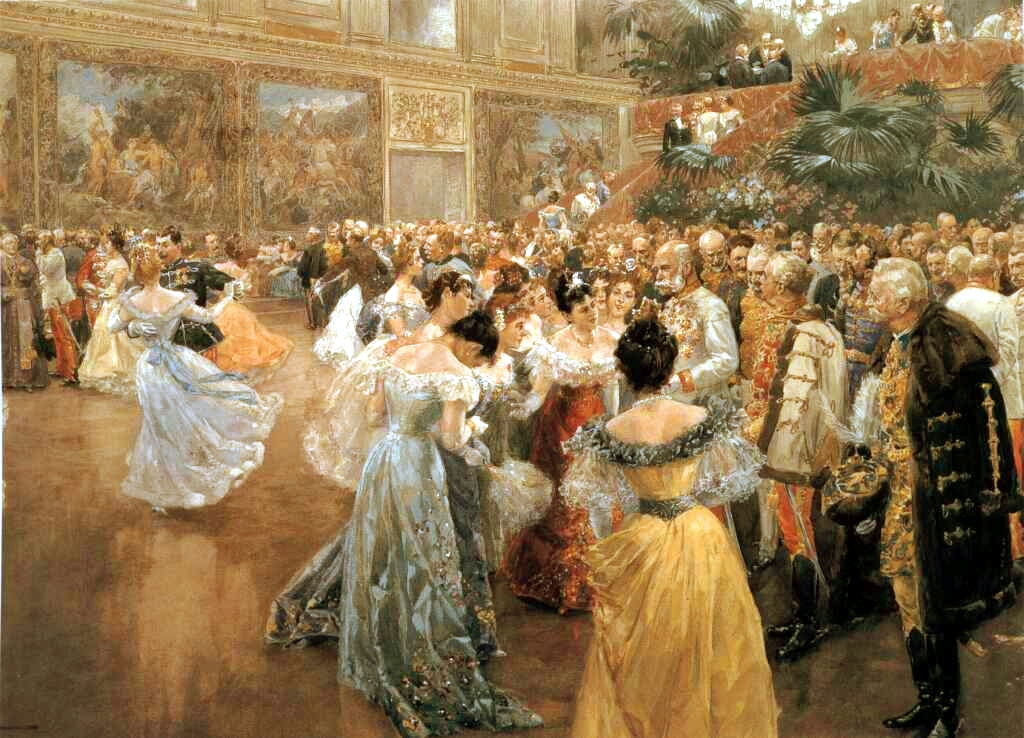
Aristocrats gathering around Emperor Franz Joseph at a ball in the Hofburg Imperial Palace, painting by Wilhelm Gause (1900).

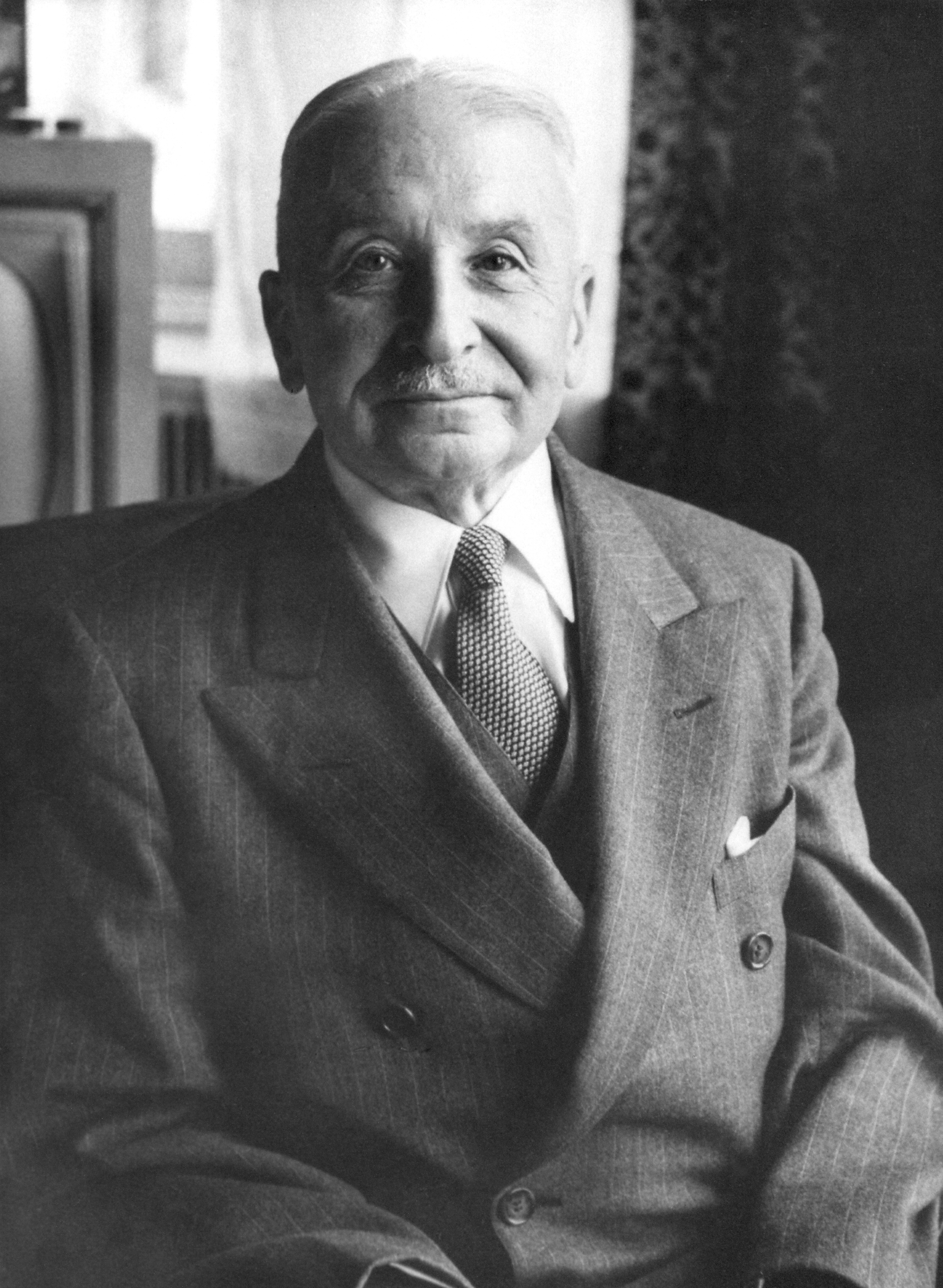
Ludwig Edler von Mises

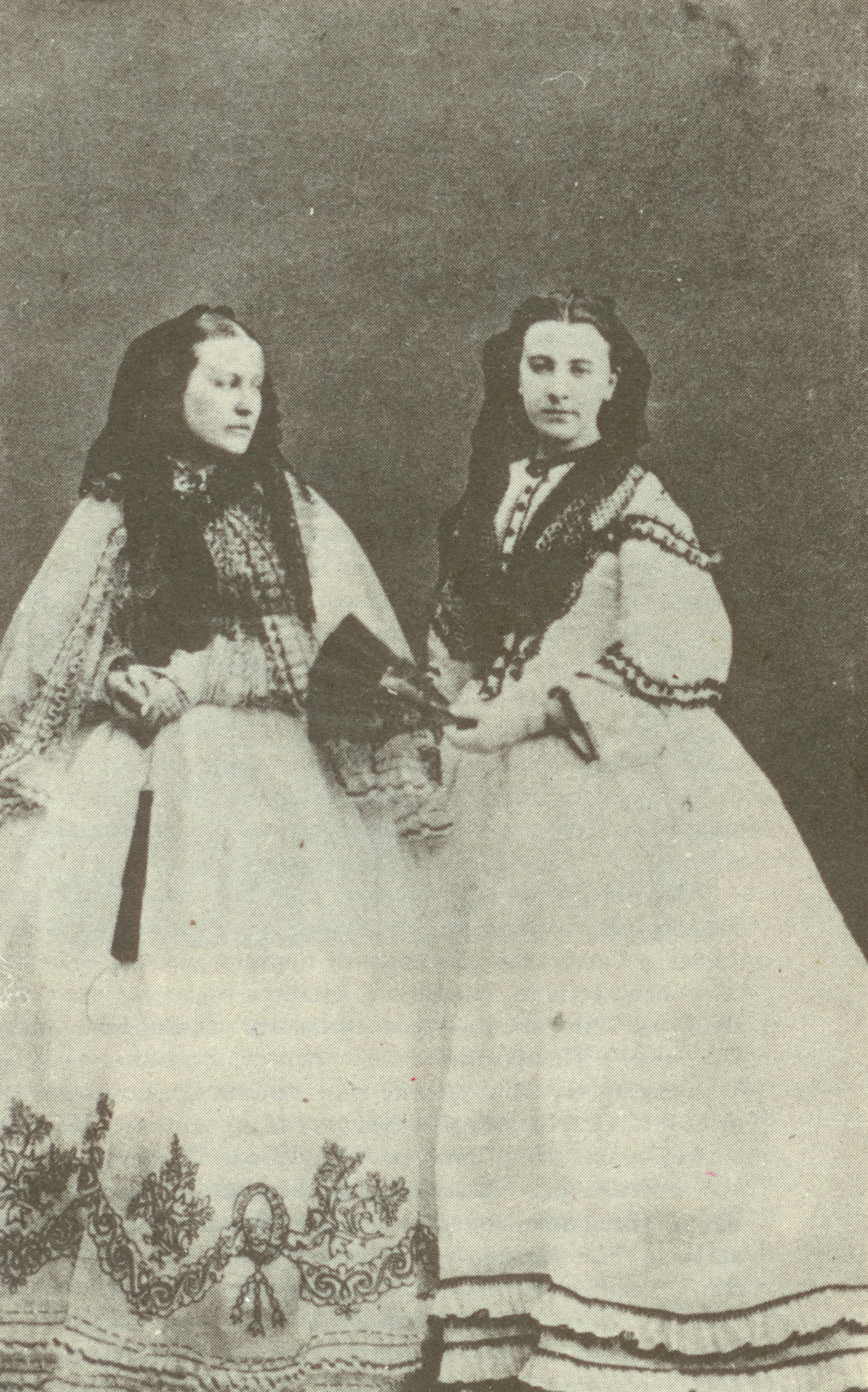
Elisabeth-Alexandrine de Ficquelmont, princess von Clary-und-Aldringen and her daughter, Edmée, countess di Robilant e Cereaglio

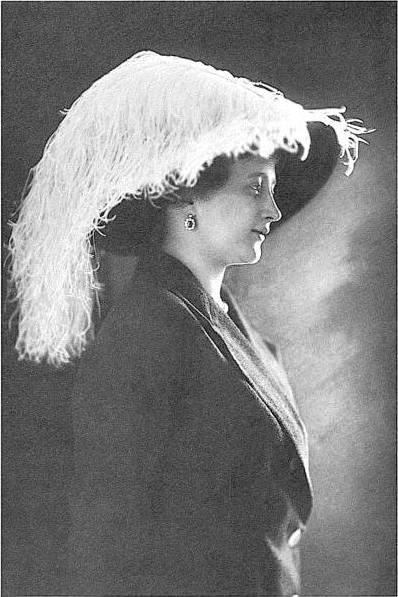
Countess Isabella Esterházy de Galánta

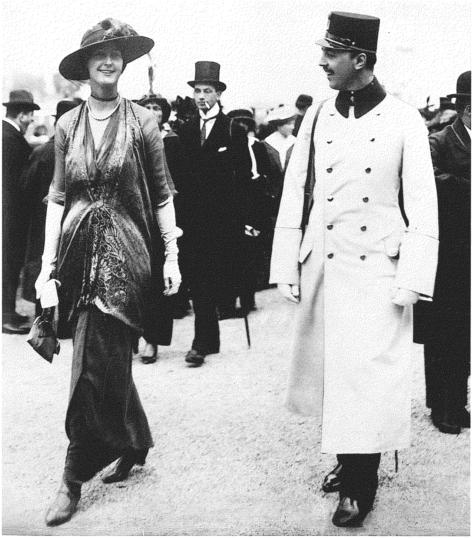
Countess Draskovich with Prince Ferdinand von Auersperg

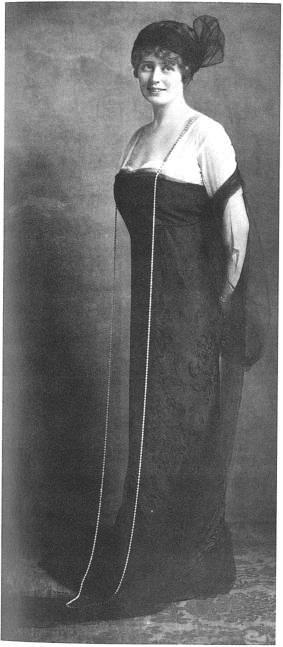
A young countess of the Schönborn family

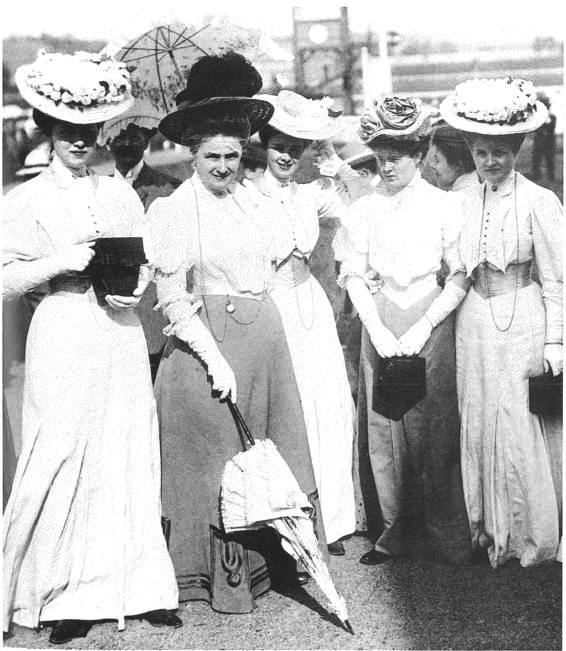
Countess Marietta Silva-Tarouca with her daughters

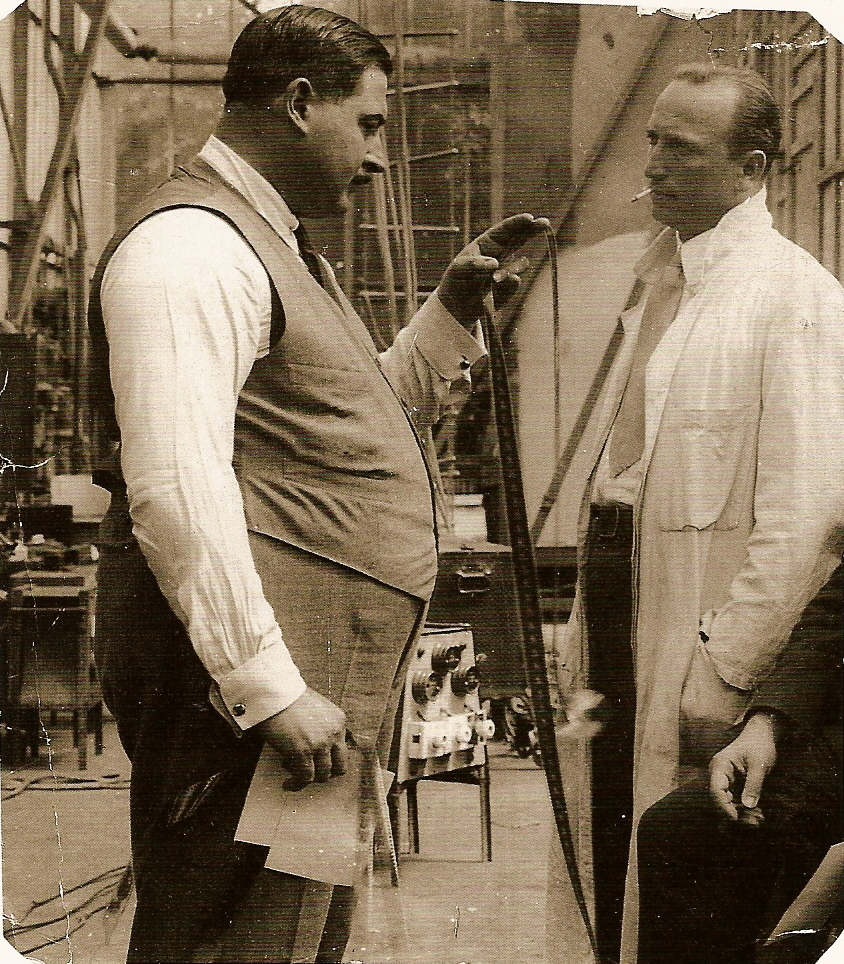
Count Alexander Kolowrat

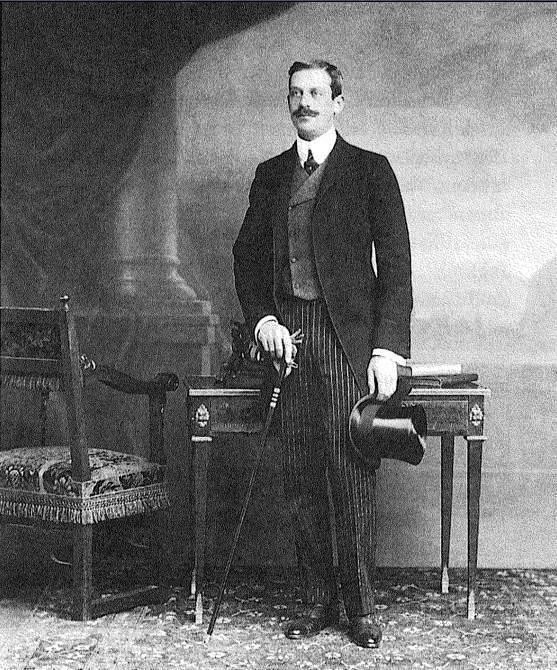
Alphonse von Rothschild

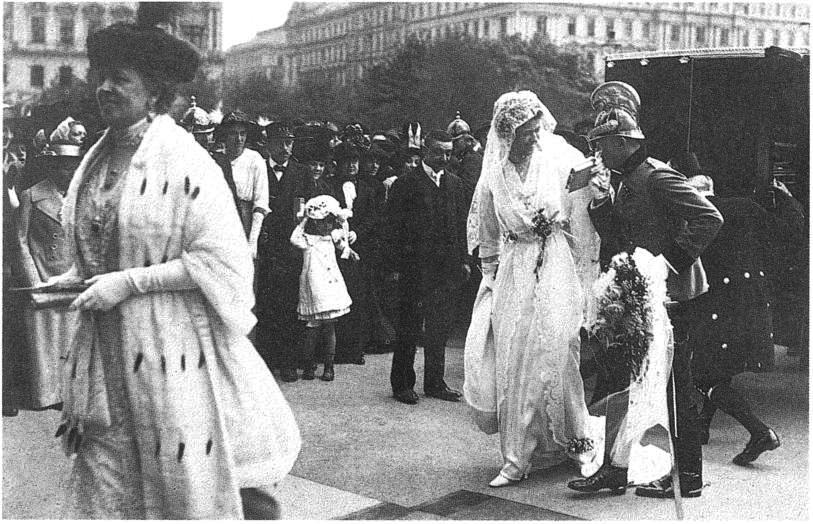
The Countess Clam-Gallas (left, wearing an ermine coat) with Countess Gabrielle Clam-Gallas and Adolf, Prince von Auersperg (right couple)

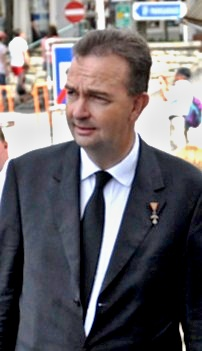
Archduke Karl of Austria, Prince Imperial of Austria, Prince Royal of Hungary, Croatia and Bohemia

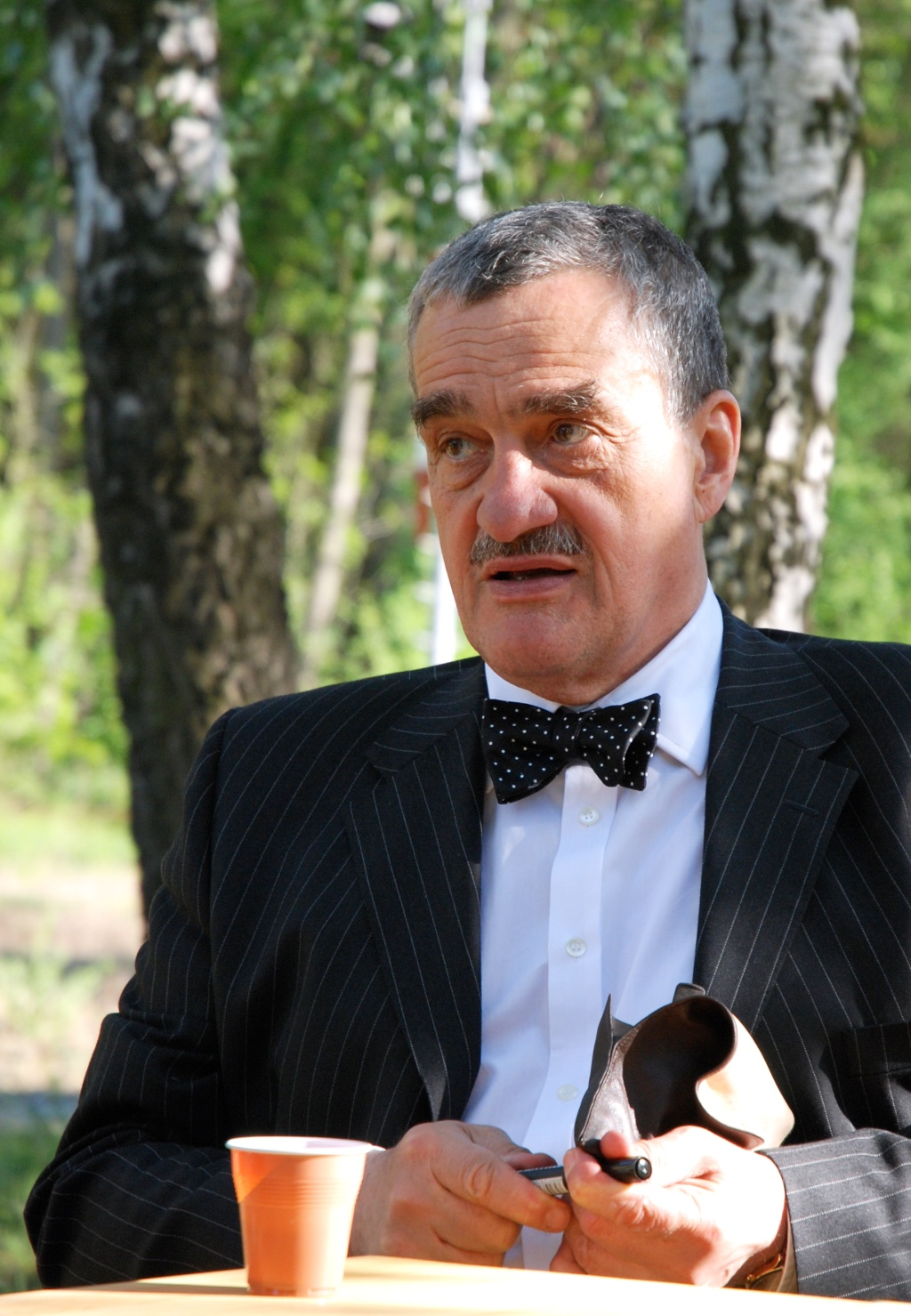
Karel, 12th Prince zu Schwarzenberg

=See also=:

List of European Jewish nobility

== Literature ==
- Binder-Krieglstein, Reinhard (2000). Österreichisches Adelsrecht 1868–1918/19: von der Ausgestaltung des Adelsrechts der cisleithanischen Reichshälfte bis zum Adelsaufhebungsgesetz der Republik unter besonderer Berücksichtigung des adeligen Namensrechts (in German). Frankfurt am Main [u.a.]: Peter Lang. ISBN 978-3-631-34833-8.
- von Coudenhove-Kalergi, Richard. Adel. Vienna. 1923.
- Frank-Döfering, Peter. Adelslexikon des österreichischen Kaisertums 1804–1918 (in German). Herder, Vienna 1989. ISBN 3-210-24925-3.
- Lieven, Dominic (1993). The aristocracy in Europe: 1815–1914 (1st ed.). New York: Columbia Univ. Press. ISBN 0-231-08112-X..
- Siegert, Heinz. Adel in Österreich(in German). Vienna 1971.
- Stekl, Hannes. Adel und Bürgertum in der Habsburgermonarchie 18. bis 20. Jahrhundert(in German). Oldenbourg, Vienna 2004. ISBN 3-486-56846-9
- Walterskirchen, Gudula. Blaues Blut für Österreich (in German). Amalthea, Vienna 2000. ISBN 3-85002-452-0
- Walterskirchen, Gudula. Der verborgene Stand. Adel in Österreich heute (in German). Amalthea, Vienna 2007. ISBN 3-85002-428-8
- Der Gotha. Supplement. Der "Österreich-Gotha". Mit Ergänzungswerken zum deutschen Adel (in German). Saur, Munich 1997. ISBN 3-598-30359-9
- Arthur Achleitner: Stöffele. Life Portrait of a Tyrolean Heroic Priest. Heinrich Kirsch, Vienna 1904; 2nd ed.: J. Habbel, Regensburg and Vienna n.d. (1918). S. 25–27
- Johannes Laichner: Stephan Krismer. Karrer Stöffele. A Pioneer of Faith in Tumultuous Times. Karres 2016. S. 12–15 ISBN 978-3-8300-9793-8.
