= Helfert =

Helfert is a surname. Notable people with the surname include:

- Michael Helfert, American scientist
- Vladimír Helfert (1886–1945), Czech musicologist

== See also ==
- Helfer (surname)
