= Marketization =

Restructuring of state enterprise to become market-oriented

Marketisation or marketization is a restructuring process that enables state enterprises to operate as market-oriented firms by changing the legal environment in which they operate.

This is achieved through reduction of state subsidies, organizational restructuring of management (corporatization), decentralization and in some cases partial privatization. These steps, it is argued, will lead to the creation of a functioning market system by converting the previous state enterprises to operate under market pressures as state-owned commercial enterprises.

== Aspects ==
=== Marketized solutions of government and market externalities ===
Here the government seeks to solve market and government externalities with market-based solutions rather than through direct administrative means. Supporters argue that the market externality of pollution can be addressed through the sale of pollution permits to companies and corporations, thus allowing the market to "see" the information and "realize" the harm done by allowing the market to transmit pollution costs to society. This is presented as an alternative to direct administrative means, whereby the government would use command and control means to direct state enterprises and private firms to comply with the guidelines.

=== Marketization of government branches ===
This is often described as "competitive federalism" or "limited government". Proponents argue that markets perform better than government administration. Therefore, marketisation seeks to make government agencies and branches compete with each other when government branches and agencies are absolutely necessary (i.e. remaining agencies and branches not privatized or liberalized away). For example, supporters argue that a voucher system for public education would make public schools compete with one another thus making them more accountable and efficient.

== Theory ==
Critics of globalization, privatization, and liberalization have deemed that it is unworkable without major government regulations to balance the forces involved. They argue that marketization can result in market failure.

Free Market thinkers like Hayek, Friedman and von Mises believe markets can work with far less government regulation. As they see it, the combination of liberalization, privatization, and marketization ensure that globalization fulfills the promises of peace, prosperity, and cooperation that its liberal scholars and philosophers have promised. Without marketization, supporters argue that government created externalities can distort the information available to the market which in turn makes the market not work as well as it could.

== Examples ==
Milton Friedman offers examples of what marketized government solutions can look like. Friedman's proposed education voucher system promotes competition between public schools (and private) thus creating a market-based solution to educational issues. See Private prison. This phenomenon is now permeating into Higher Education in general, with research suggesting that students rather than being perceived as learners are now viewed as customers and therefore a critical component in the business model of many universities

== Nonprofit and voluntary sector ==
=== Overview of nonprofit organizations ===
Nonprofit organizations came to fruition when people began to recognize that society had needs for services rendered by neither the government nor the private sector. These organizations were created to address these needs. However, due to their overall missions, it is frowned upon for these organizations to make a profit. Therefore, by their very nature, their funding sources remain ambiguous. This results in nonprofits becoming resource dependent and continuing to struggle to find and maintain funding. This struggle has resulted in marketization of NPOs.

==== Rationale ====
Commercialization or marketization (the terms are often used interchangeably in the marketization debate among scholars) occurs when an NPO decides to provide goods or services with the intent of turning a profit. Nonprofits' resource dependency often lead them to constantly look for additional, nonconventional for nonprofit, funding. Factors behind a nonprofits decision to marketize are usually compounded by issues such as increased demand for services, inability to tax, and other funding sources' inability to cover operational and service costs for the NPO. In return, the NPO enters into a mixed marketplace and thus begins to compete either with other NPOs or for-profit entities.

==== Funding sources ====
Nonprofit organizations have been notoriously plagued with funding issues since their inception. This is due largely in part to the basic concept of nonprofits: to provide a service that neither the government nor the private sector provides a population. Nonprofit organizations receive funding in three ways: 1. Public sources and subsidies; 2. Charitable giving, endowments, major donors; 3. Fee-based services and venture enterprises.

==== Public sources and subsidies ====
A public source refers to government assistance either through awarded grants or appropriated funding. Prior to the 1960s, nonprofit organizations relied mostly on fee-for-services and charitable giving. However, with the political climate changing significantly, it became apparent that society was using nonprofit organizations more than before. Additionally, governmental entities realized that by entering into a public-private partnership, they could fund nonprofit organizations and essentially hire then to provide services that governments did not want to provide. Nonprofit organizations began to apply and receive grant awards and appropriations for services. This trend in funding began to decline in the 1980s under the Reagan administration. With the reduction in funding available from the federal government, nonprofits have become increasingly competitive amongst each other.

Additionally, grant money often comes with performance measures or quotas that are required to meet in order to maintain funding. Many nonprofits do not have either the administrative capacity to track this data or the ability to physically meet the performance measures.

==== Charitable giving, endowments, and major donors ====
Charitable giving, endowments and donations do play a significant role in funding for NPOs. However, this still does not provide enough funding for NPOs to maintain sustainability and provide adequate services.

==== Fee-for-services ====
A fee-based service is not a new concept for nonprofit organizations. Prior to the 1960s, nonprofits quite often utilized a fee-for-service model. This most commonly is seen in nonprofit hospitals. Additionally, gift shops at museums are another form of revenue often associated with fee-for-service models.

=== Current literature ===
Literature related to the marketization of the nonprofit and voluntary sector is broad in scope and enhanced marketization of the sector is the subject of "considerable debate among both scholars and practitioners." One side of the debate asserts potential positive effects from increased marketization and one side engages the idea that primarily negative effects are associated with the integration of commercial ideology within nonprofit organizations.

==== Pros ====
Marketization is seen by some to hold the ability to provide positive outcomes for nonprofit organizations. One such potential benefit is the diversification of revenue streams and enhanced financial stability. With commercial and market approaches gaining popularity as alternative or supplementary funding sources, their flexibility and less-restrictive nature as revenue sources are noted.

Portions of the literature surrounding nonprofit marketization also consider the positive effects that result from the aforementioned diversified and more sustainable collection of revenue streams. The ability of market-associated activities to "contribute to an organization's self sufficiency and ability to attract and retain staff" is discussed. The efficiency and effectiveness of organizations utilizing market-based revenue strategies are said to see potential enhancement "by reducing the need for donated funds, by providing a more reliable, diversified funding base", or by enhancing the overall quality of programs "by instilling market discipline".

Studies conducted of commercial activity in national nonprofit services associations and voluntary social agencies "discovered that such initiatives were generally related to and contributed substantively to mission accomplishment". In the same vein, it has been said that leaders within the nonprofit sector can see benefit from understanding and finding ways to employ commercial forces for social good.

==== Con ====
Negative associations between marketization and the nonprofit sector are also present within the literature. One of the main criticisms brought forth against the integration of commercial principles and activities within voluntary organizations is the potential for diversion from the original organization mission. According to Tuckman, a "strong likelihood exists that the missions of nonprofits engaged in commercial activities will grow more ambiguous over time." The potential tendency of leadership to increasingly look at activities in terms of revenue is also as a result of increased commercial activity is discussed.

Structural organizational changes are also mentioned as a potential negative impact of enhanced commercial activity among nonprofits. From organizational changes necessary to accommodate market-based endeavors, such as growth in "number and scope" of administrative offices that manage profit-seeking efforts, to the "tendency to replace traditional, social problem-focused board members with entrepreneurial, business-oriented individuals," changes take effort from work directly related to mission accomplishment.

Aside from diversion from mission and structural/staffing changes, the literature notes the potential for lost sector legitimacy as the "distinctions between the business, government, and nonprofit sectors continue to blur and their efforts overlap." Related to this blurring effect, is the theory that civil society is at risk as a result of enhanced marketization within the voluntary organizations. Eikenberry and Kluver, in their article entitled, "The Marketization of the Nonprofit Sector: Civil Society at Risk," describes the idea that marketization trends negatively impact the unique roles nonprofit organizations play within society. Overall, this theory stands on the thesis that marketization "may harm democracy and citizenship because of its impact on nonprofit organizations' ability to create and maintain a strong civil society."

The responsibility of nonprofits to those in need is said to become potentially overshadowed by economic and competition-centered values that result from enhanced market-based and commercial activities. Increased desire of voluntary organizations to "secure competitive advantage in the pursuit of producing individual-level goods and services for those who can afford them," rather than those defined in the original organizational mission.

==== Marketisation and existing market theory ====
In considering the applicability of the existing literature on contingency theory and perspectives on competitive advantage to the marketised social care sector in the UK, Dearnaley identified a number of areas in each that restrict its value in analysing and responding to the new market environment: the retrospective nature of theories of competitive advantage and foci on differentiation and cost leadership make these inappropriate for this new marketplace; the intangibility of competitive advantage, and particularly sustainable competitive advantage; the relative inflexibility of classical contingency theory.

== See also ==
- Capitalism
- Classic liberalism
- Corporatization
- Deregulation
- Free market
- Market socialism
- State capitalism
