= Theodore Theodorsen =

Norwegian aerodynamicist (1897–1978)

- Born: January 8, 1897; Sandefjord Municipality, Vestfold; Norway
- Died: November 5, 1978 (aged 81); Long Island, New York, United States
- Occupation: Aerodynamicist
- Spouse: Johanne Magdelene Theodorsen
- Children: Muriel Gerd-Preutz; Theodore Elliott Theodorsen; John Willman Theodorsen
- Parent(s): Ole Christian Theodorsen; Andrea Larsen

Theodore Theodorsen (January 8, 1897 – November 5, 1978) was a Norwegian-American theoretical aerodynamicist noted for his work at NACA (the forerunner of NASA) and for his contributions to the study of turbulence.

== Early years ==
Theodorsen was born in Sandefjord Municipality in Vestfold, Norway to parents Ole Christian Theodorsen, a chief engineer in the Norwegian merchant marine, and his wife Andrea Larsen. He was the oldest of six children. When Theodore’s father took the examinations for a merchant marine engineer's license, he was the only applicant who correctly answered a particularly difficult question. To his father’s surprise his then 12-year-old son was also able to solve the problem.

At age 16, after finishing compulsory schooling, Theodorsen attended gymnasium in the nearby town of Larvik. Theodorsen's grades were so outstanding that he was admitted to the leading engineering university in Norway, the Norwegian Institute of Technology in Trondheim.

== Emigration ==
In 1922 Theodorsen graduated with a master's degree in mechanical engineering and was offered a position at the university as an instructor. That year one of his students was Lars Onsager, who became a lifelong friend and later went on to win a Nobel Prize in Chemistry. Theodorsen, like many Norwegian engineers, decided after some years as an instructor in Norway to emigrate. There were few jobs for engineers in Norway at the time. His wife's family knew a retired Norwegian sea captain who lived in Baltimore, so that became their American destination. They arrived in the United States on board the SS Stavangerfjord on August 25, 1924.

== Johns Hopkins University ==
Because there were few jobs in Baltimore, Theodorsen took a job working the third shift as an oiler at the Sparrows Point electrical generating plant 20 miles from Baltimore. Then Johns Hopkins University advertised for an instructor in mechanical engineering and he obtained the position. He taught at Johns Hopkins for five years. In 1928, Onsager, taught at Johns Hopkins for one semester. It was at that time that Onsager suggested to Theodorsen that he obtain a doctorate in physics.

Theodorsen's thesis dealt with thermodynamic and aerodynamic themes that were to permeate much of his later work, which was developed in two parts: 1) shock waves and explosions and 2) combustion and detonation. Through the urging of Joseph Ames, president of Johns Hopkins University and Chairman of the Executive Committee of the National Advisory Committee for Aeronautics (NACA), Theodorsen went to NACA in 1929 as an associate physicist.

== National Advisory Committee for Aeronautics ==
The NACA facility adjoined Langley Air Force Base near Hampton, Virginia. The only in-house research arm of NACA at the time, it had a highly motivated young staff. The work atmosphere was informal though competitive, with much open stimulating discussion. However, conditions were rather primitive. The library consisted of one small shelf of books. Theodorsen used as his mainstays Hutte Mechanical Engineering Handbook and a set of the 1929 edition of the Handbuch der Physik.

Within a short time Theodorsen was made head of the Physical Research Division, the other research divisions being Engine Research and Aerodynamics. Langley NACA was then in the process of expanding its experimental facilities to include a Full Scale Wind Tunnel and a Hydrodynamic Towing Basin for testing flying boat hulls. The proposed location of the towing basin had formerly been a bombing range. One of Theodorsen's first activities was the invention of an instrument for detecting buried metals and on its first use it located a live bomb.

The ensuing years were highly productive ones for Theodorsen in a number of experimental and theoretical areas. Theodorsen improved thin airfoil theory by introducing the angle of best streamlining, developed the now classical and elegant theory of arbitrary wing sections, performed the first in-house noise research, worked on fire prevention in aircraft and on means of icing removal and prevention, contributed to the theory of open, closed and partially open wind-tunnel test sections, developed the basic theory of aircraft flutter and its verification, made early measurements of skin friction at transonic and supersonic speeds, developed the use of freon for experimental aeroelastic work, gave damping properties of structures and expanded general propeller theory. During World War II Theodorsen was called on for the analysis and troubleshooting of many aircraft problems and to help devise necessary modifications.

== Expanding on significant themes ==
Theodorsen was an innovative practical engineer at a time in which most of his contemporary theoretical aerodynamists were at educational institutions and thus not involved in practical engineering solutions. Theodorsen’s work is especially significant in that it still plays an important role in current research and technology.

The theory of arbitrary airfoils based on conformal mapping developed by Theodorsen, is a model of classical applied mathematics. Two key concepts made Theodorsen’s approach different from and a clear improvement on the methods that preceded it, such as that of von Mises and von Karman. One was the important use of the complex variable not in the usual form of a polynomial or power series, but in the form of an exponential to power series. The equation led directly to the basic boundary value equation which, as an integral equation, represents an exact solution of the problem in terms of the given airfoil data. This solution gave the exact pressure distribution around an airfoil of arbitrary shape. Seldom in aeronautics are solutions "exact". This is one of the very few. The method has been automated so that complete pressure distributions for a given airfoil section can be obtained in a matter of seconds. The philosophy in Theodorsen’s approach was that an exact formulation is often simpler and preferable to an approximate one and that although approximations are essential in applied mathematics, they should be delayed as much as possible.

Theodorsen's approach on flutter was also direct and clean, leading to an exact solution, as contrasted with previous implicit and approximate results. This exact flutter solution including results for control surfaces has had a key role in the development of flutter methods in the United States. It has enabled an engineering feel for the effects of variables and parameters in complex situations and has been available as a model against which approximate solutions can be compared.

Although Theodorsen leaned strongly toward basic theoretical analysis, he usually accompanied his work with experimental verification. He was highly innovative in engineering and experimental activities, where he always sought a theoretical framework or was guided by physical intuition. He was responsible for proposing a wind tunnel for flutter work that employed a mixture of air and freon with variable pressure to greatly increase the scope of research with aeroelastic models throughout the Mach range and with lower horsepower requirements. The Transonic Dynamics Wind Tunnel now used exclusively for aeroelastic research is based on the same principles.

Another unique facility due Theodorsen was the helicopter rotor tower for aerodynamic and noise research. Ideal propeller dynamics was given a definitive treatment in several reports and a book. Theodorsen was the earliest to obtain reliable skin-friction drag data at subsonic, transonic, and supersonic speeds.

== Later years ==
After leaving NACA in 1946, Theodorsen helped organize and administer the Instituto Tecnológico de Aeronáutica (Aeronautical Institute of Technology) (1947–1950) in Brazil. Then he served as Chief Scientist for the U.S. Air Force from 1950 to 1954, during which time he did important work on the structure of turbulence. Theodorsen then became the Chief of Research for Republic Aviation Corporation, manufacturer of the P-47 Thunderbolt fighter plane of World War II, and the later F-84 Thunderjet and the F-105 Thunderchief, a post from which he retired in 1962 when he became an active consultant to Sikorsky Helicopter Corporation, where he specialized in ducted propeller work and helicopter rotors.

== Turbulence theory ==
A significant development was his contribution to the structure of turbulence in a paper honoring Ludwig Prandtl’s 75th birthday. The universality of turbulence from microphenomena to astrophysics is well known. Turbulence remains the major unsolved domain of fluid mechanics. Theodorsen identified the main turbulence-creating terms in the equations of motion as (q x curl q . curl curl q); he showed that two-dimensional turbulence cannot exist; that vortex lines stretching and bending is the important mechanism and ingredient of turbulence. He also discussed the hierarchy of vortices (Kolmogorov).

== Theory of relativity ==
Although Theodorsen's life work was in aerodynamics, and he published numerous books and papers in that field, he had other interests. In particular, he wrote a paper, "Relativity and Classical Physics" which sought to show that the results of Albert Einstein's theory of general relativity could be obtained without resorting to curved space-time by a modification of Newton's law of universal gravitation. The paper presents "a successful transformation of the theory of relativity into classical physics... The mathematical entities of the Einstein development have been redefined into rational physical quantities and rearranged in an organized classical framework. Einstein's space-time has been eliminated and replaced by cognitive time." It was published in the Proceedings of the DKNVS Theodorsen Colloquium and on two later occasions.

== Personal life ==
In 1922 Theodorsen married Johanne Magdelene Hoem. Her family was from Trondheim. They were married in Nidaros Cathedral, the largest existing medieval church in Scandinavia. The wedding party was held at the Britannia Hotel. Their daughter Muriel Gerd-Preutz and sons Theodore Elliott and John Willman were all born in the United States.

In 1976, Theodorsen was awarded an honorary doctorate from the Norwegian University of Science and Technology in Trondheim. The Royal Norwegian Society of Sciences and Letters also held a colloquium in his honor at Trondheim. After a short illness, Theodorsen died in 1978 at the age of 81 at his home in Centerport, Long Island, New York.

== Selected works ==
- The Theory of Wind-Tunnel Wall Interference (1931)
- A new principle of sound frequency analysis (1931)
- The prevention of ice formation on gasoline tank vents (1931)
- General Potential Theory of Arbitrary Wing Sections (1932)
- Experimental Verification of the Theory of Wind-Tunnel Boundary Interference (1934)
- General theory of aerodynamic instability and the mechanism of flutter (1935)
- Characteristics of six propellers including the high-speed range (1937)
- Nonstationary flow about a wing-aileron-tab combination including aerodynamic balance (1942)
- Extension of The Chaplygin Proofs on the Existence of Compressible Flow Solutions to the Supersonic Region (1946)
- Theory of Propellers (1948)
- The Structure of Turbulence (1954)
- Theory of Static Propellers and Helicopter Rotors (1968)

== Other sources ==
- Anderson, John David. A History of Aerodynamics and its impact on Flying Machines. (Cambridge University Press, 1999) ISBN 0-521-66955-3
- Dowell, Earl H. (ed.) A Modern view and appreciation of the works of Theodore Theodorsen, physicist and engineer. (American Institute of Aeronautics and Astronautics, 1992) ISBN 0-930403-85-1
- Hansen, James R. (ed.) The Wind and Beyond: A Documentary Journey into the History of Aerodynamics in America (National Aeronautics and Space Administration, 2003) ISBN 0-7567-4314-1
- Jones, R. T. (comp.) Classical Aerodynamic Theory. (University Press of the Pacific, 2005) ISBN 1-4102-2489-9
