= Von Trapp =

Von Trapp may refer to:

== People ==
- Trapp Family, sometimes referred to as the von Trapp Family
  - Agathe von Trapp, of the Trapp family (daughter)
  - Georg von Trapp, of the Trapp family (father)
  - Maria von Trapp, of the Trapp family (mother)
- The von Trapps, great-grandchildren of Georg and Maria von Trapp

== See also ==
- The Sound of Music, a musical about the von Trapp family
- Von Trapp children (disambiguation)
- The von Trapp Family: A Life of Music, a 2015 German-Austrian musical drama film
- von Trapp Brewing, a brewery owned by the von Trapp family
