= Tschugguel =

Tschugguel is an Austrian surname originally from South Tyrol. Notable people with the surname include:

- Peter von Tramin (Peter Tschugguel), Austrian writer
- Alexander Tschugguel, Austrian Catholic activist
