= Doderer =

Doderer is a German surname. It can mean a stuttering person in English. Variations include Doberer, Doder, Doderlein and Döderlein.

Notable people with the name include:

== Doderer ==
- Joop Doderer (1921–2005), Dutch actor
- Johanna Doderer (born 1969), Austrian composer
- Minnette Doderer (1923–2005), American politician

== von Doderer ==
- Heimito von Doderer (1896–1966), Austrian writer

== Variations ==
- Doberer
- Doder
- Doderlein
- Döderlein (disambiguation)
