= Gaupp =

Gaupp is a surname. Notable people with the surname include:

- Ernst Gaupp (1865–1916), a German anatomist
- Robert Gaupp (1870–1953), a German psychiatrist and neurologist
- Natalie Gaupp (b. 1967), an American playwright
