= Von Einem family =

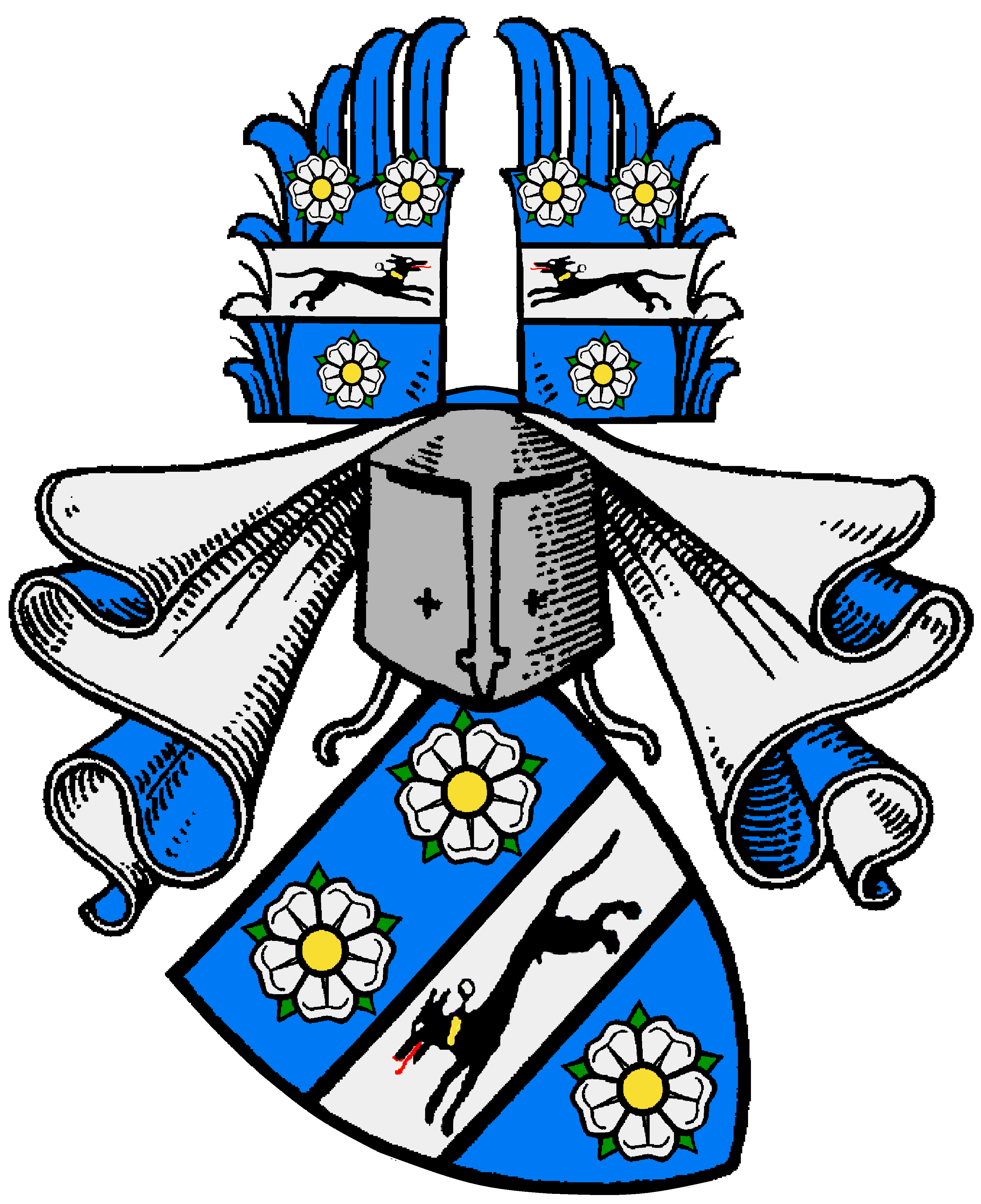
Coat of Arms of the Einem family from 1492

The von Einem is an old German and Austrian noble family, originated in Lower Saxony. They appeared in written documents in 1284 with the name of Johannes de Eynem as a Burgomaster of Einbeck. Members of the family had significant military positions in the Kingdom of Prussia and later in the German Empire.

== Notable members ==
- Ferdinand Theodor von Einem (1826–1876), owner of a candy factory in Russian Empire, which was nationalized as "Red October"
- Karl von Einem (1853–1934), German general
- Gottfried von Einem (1918–1996), Austrian composer
- Charlotte von Einem (1930-2022), Austrian author and playwright
- Bevan Spencer von Einem (1945–2025), Australian murderer
- Caspar Einem (1948–2021), Austrian politician and minister
- Samuel Von Einem (born 1995), Australian table tennis player
