= Philipp Schey von Koromla =

Austro-Hungarian merchant (1798–1881)

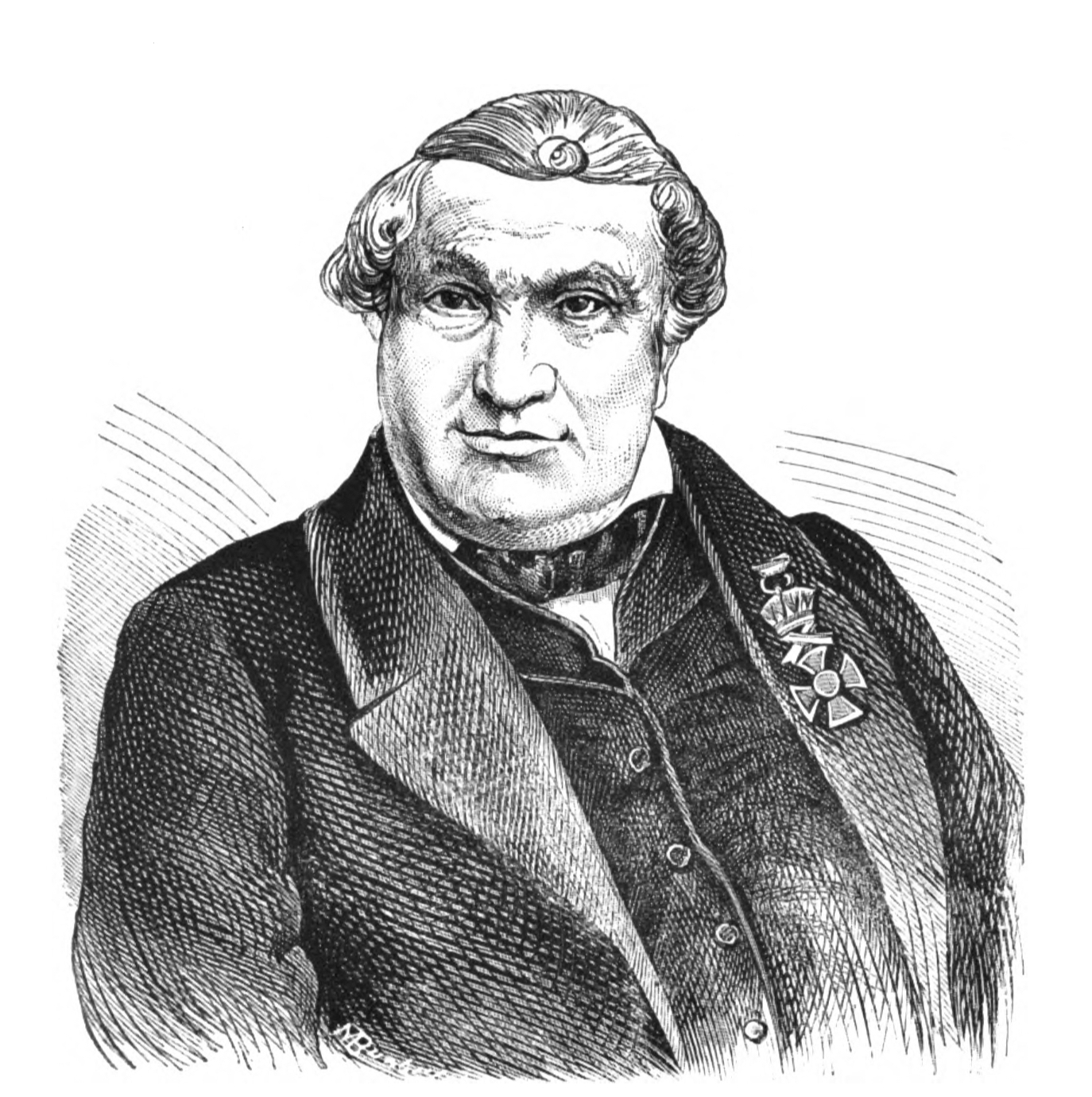
Philipp Schey von Koromla in 1868

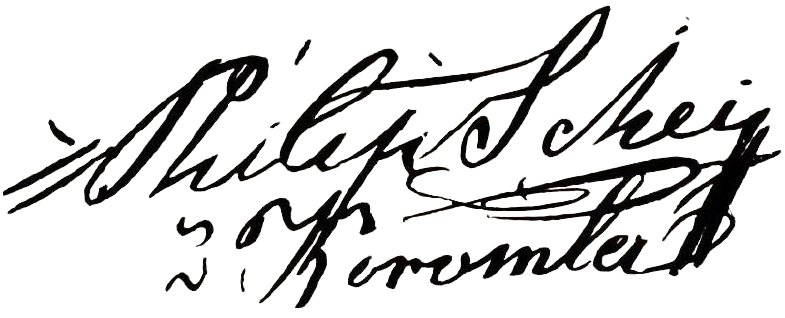
signature

Philipp Schey Freiherr von Koromla (Hungarian: koromlai Schey Fülöp; 20 September 1798 – 26 June 1881) was an Austro-Hungarian merchant and philanthropist. He was the first Hungarian Jew elevated into the Austrian nobility.

His daughter, Charlotte, was the mother of Hans Leo Przibram.
