= Erich von Hornbostel =

German-Ashkenazi Jewish musicologist (1877-1935)

E. M. von Hornbostel

Erich Moritz von Hornbostel (25 February 1877 – 28 November 1935) was an Austrian ethnomusicologist, comparative musicologist, and scholar of music. He is remembered for his pioneering work in the field of ethnomusicology, and for the Sachs–Hornbostel system of musical instrument classification which he co-authored with Curt Sachs. He is also known as the father of the "Berlin School of Ethnomusicology" in conjunction with Carl Stumpf.

== Life ==
Hornbostel was born in Vienna into a musical family. The House of Hornbostel is nobility from Lower Saxony. He studied the piano, harmony and counterpoint as a child, but his PhD at the University of Vienna was in chemistry. He moved to Berlin, where he fell under the influence of Carl Stumpf and worked with him on musical psychology and psychoacoustics. He was Stumpf's assistant at the Berlin Psychological Institute, and when the archives of the Institute were used as the basis for the Berliner Phonogramm-Archiv, he became its first director in 1905. Hornbostel referred to Stumf as the Altmeister as well as a fatherly friend to him. It was during his time there that he worked with Curt Sachs to produce the Sachs–Hornbostel system of musical instrument classification (published 1914).

In his work, he was described by fellow musicologist Jaap Kunst as aloof and someone who "did not concern himself with others." Starting in 1923, he started teaching at the Berlin Psychological Institute where he taught classes covering the topics of music psychology, comparative musicology, and music ethnology. From the result of his teaching, there were two students who earned their doctorates under him in comparative musicology, Mieczyslaw Kolinski and Frtiz Bose.

In 1933, he was sacked from all his posts by the Nazi Party because his mother was Jewish. He moved first to Switzerland, then the United States, and finally to Cambridge in England, where he worked on an archive of non-European folk music recordings. He died there in 1935 leaving behind a legacy as a key figure in ushering the next wave of comparative musicologists through his contributions in the Berlin Phonogramm-Archiv.

== Contributions ==
Hornbostel did much work in the field of ethnomusicology, then usually referred to as comparative musicology. In 1906, he was in America to study the music and psychology of the Pawnee people, Native Americans in the state of Oklahoma. Some of the other studies he conducted was on the native music of Tunisia and the South Sea Islanders. In the South Sea Islands, Hornbostel collected and analyzed recordings focusing on preservation which helped contribute greatly to the Berlin Phonogramm-Archiv as a central repository for non-European music.

Hornbostel's students include American composer Henry Cowell and the ethnomusicologist Klaus Wachsmann. Hornbostel specialized in African and Asian music, making many recordings and developing a system that facilitated the transcription of non-Western music from record to paper. He saw the musical tunings used by various cultural groups as an essential element in determining the character of their music, and did much work in comparing different tunings. A lot of this work has been criticized since, but in its time, this was a rarely explored area. Hornbostel also argued that music should be a part of more general anthropological research.

Hornbostel also contributed to the theory of binaural hearing, propose the theory of interaural time difference as the main cue, and developing sound localization devices (for finding the directions to artillery, aircraft, submarines, etc.) for the German war effort during World War I. With Max Wertheimer, he developed a directional listening device that they referred to as the Wertbostel.

== Selected works ==
- Hornbostel, Erich M. von. 1910. Über vergleichende akustische und musikpsychologische Untersuchungen. Beiträge zur Akustik und Musikwissenschaft 5: 143-167
- Stumpf, C. and E. v. Hornbostel. 1911. Über die Bedeutung ethnologischer Untersuchungen für die Psychologie und Ästhetik der Tonkunst. Beiträge zur Akustik und Musikwissenschaft 6: 102-115
- Hornbostel, E. v. 1913. Über ein akustisches Kriterium für Kulturzusammenhänge. Beiträge zur Akustik und Musikwissenschaft 7: 1-20
- Erich M. v. Hornbostel and Curt Sachs: Systematik der Musikinstrumente. Ein Versuch. In: Zeitschrift für Ethnologie. Band 46, 1914, Heft 4–5, S. 553–590.
- Beobachtungen über ein- und zweiohriges Hören. In: Zeitschrift für Psychologie und ihre Grenzwissenschaften. Band 4, 1923, S. 64–114.
