= Leonardi =

Leonardi may refer to:

== Biology ==
- Anomochilus leonardi, snake
- Austrocordulia leonardi, dragonfly
- Conus leonardi, predatory sea snail
- Phlyctimantis leonardi, frog
- Rafflesia leonardi, parasitic plant

== Other uses ==
- Leonardi (surname), including a list of people with the name

== See also ==
- Leonhardi, a surname
