= Bakonyi =

Bakonyi is a Hungarian surname. Notable people with the surname include:

- Elek Bakonyi (1904–1982), Hungarian chess master
- Peter Bakonyi (1933–1997), Hungarian-born Canadian fencer
- Péter Bakonyi (born 1938), Hungarian fencer
- Stefano Bakonyi (1892–1969), Hungarian writer
