= Décsey =

The Décsey family (Hungarian: Kisdobai és Nagydobai Décsey (Décsei) család) is a Hungarian noble family originating from the Transylvanian village of Maros-Décse around the late 13th or early 14th century. The full surname and name of the noble house is Décsey de Maros-Décse et Nagy-Doba.

== Origins ==
Though the exact origins of the family is not known, it is possible that the family dates to the Magyar settling of the area. They were nobles of both the Kingdom of Hungary and the Principality of Transylvania and had properties in Maros-Décse (Romanian: Decea), Enyed (Romanian: Aiud), Kis-Doba (Romanian: Doba Mică) and Nagy-Doba (Romanian: Doba Mare).

The first documented mention of a member of the Décsey family still in existence is of Péter Décsey, who had received a grant of land from Holy Roman Emperor Sigismund as a gift for services to the Bán of Timișoara, Pipo of Ozora in 1413.

== Notable members ==
- Péter Décsey (1413), of Maros-Décse
- Fruzsina Décsey (born 1486, married 1505), married István Bánffy de Losoncz
- János Décsey (1561), Chancellor of the Transylvanian Royal Court
- Balthasar Décsey (died 1591), of Maros-Décse
- Sigismund Décsey I, member of the Transylvanian Royal Court
- Sigismund Décsey II (1732), Viscount of Doboka
- László Décsey (1848-1849), a leader of the Hungarian Revolution against the Habsburgs in 1848. Sentenced to death for rebellion but later pardoned.

== Memorial to Balthasar ==
When Balthasar died in 1591, his father Ferencz Décsey had a memorial created in the Reformed Church of Maros-Décse. The memorial shows the family Coat of Arms as well as a eulogy to Balthasar written in Latin. Much of the Latin inscriptions have faded or have been damaged, but the following can be read from the stone memorial:

"Ego Balthasar Detsey infelix puer, filius Francisci Detsey a Deo ad immortalitatum vocatus Anno 1591. A Patre hoc Monumento donatus."

== Coat of arms ==
Arms: Argent, growing from a mount in base vert, a dead tree entwined with a serpent proper, crowned or. The helm ducally crowned. Mantling: Dexter, or and azure; sinister, argent and gules.

== See also ==
- Cireșoaia, Bistrița-Năsăud County (Hungarian: Magyardécse)
- Decea, Alba County (Hungarian: Marosdécse)
- Doba, Sălaj (Hungarian: Kisdoba and Nagydoba)
