= Gomperz =

Gomperz, Gompertz, Gumpertz, Gumperz, Gomperts or Gompers is a surname. Notable people with the surname include:

- Aaron Solomon Gumperz (1723–1769), Jewish German scholar and physician
- Benjamin Gompertz (1779–1865), British actuary, and mathematician
  - Gompertz function, named for Benjamin Gompertz
- Don Gumpertz, sailor who circled the world on MV Westward in the 1970s
- Henry Gompertz (1867–1930), English-born judge active in Hong Kong and the Federated Malay States.
- Ian Gompertz (born 1975), English cricketer
- John J. Gumperz, linguist
- Julian Gumperz, German sociologist, communist activist, publicist and translator
- Heinrich Gomperz (1873–1942), Austrian philosopher
- Isaac Gompertz (1774–1856), English poet
- Lewis Gompertz (1783/4–1865), English activist, philosopher, writer and inventor
- Louis Gompertz (1886–1951), Anglo-Indian soldier and writer
- Marcia Gumpertz, American statistician
- Samuel W. Gompertz (1868–1952), American showman
- Sydney G. Gumpertz (1879–1971), American soldier in World War I
- Theodor Gomperz (1832–1912), Moravian-Austrian philologist
- Will Gompertz (born 1964), British arts journalist
- Samuel Gompers (1850–1924), US labour organizer and founder of the AFL
- Dr Rebecca Gomperts (born 1966), founder of Women on Waves.

== See also ==
- Palais Gomperz, Vienna
- Simpson Gumpertz & Heger Inc.
