= Stross =

Stross is an uncommon British surname. It may refer to:

- Barnett Stross (1899–1967), British doctor and politician
- Charles Stross (born 1964), writer based in Edinburgh, Scotland; grandnephew of Barnett Stross
- Raymond Stross (1915–1988), British film producer
- Wilhelm Stross (1907–1966), German violinist and composer
