= Maurer (disambiguation) =

Maurer is a surname.

Maurer may also refer to:

- Maurer, Perth Amboy, a neighbourhood in New Jersey, United States
- Maurer AG, a German steel construction company and roller coaster manufacturer
- Maurer Motorsport, Swiss auto racing team
- Maurer Motorsport (Germany), German race car builder
