= Almásy =

Hungarian surname

Almásy is a surname. Notable people with this surname include:

- György Almásy (1867–1933), Hungarian asiologist, traveler, and zoologist
- László Almásy (1895–1951), Hungarian aristocrat
- László Almásy (politician) (1869–1936), Hungarian jurist, soldier and politician
- Pál Almásy (1818–1882), Hungarian lawyer and politician
- Paul Almásy (1906–2003), Hungarian photographer
- Peter Almásy (born 1961), French ice hockey player
