= Hagenauer =

Hagenauer is a surname of German origin. It may refer to the following people:

- Franz Hagenauer (1906–1986), Austrian sculptor
- Friedrich Hagenauer (1829–1909), Australian missionary
- Joachim Hagenauer (1941–2026), German information theorist and academic
- Johann Baptist von Hagenauer (1732–1811), Austrian sculptor
- Johann Georg von Hagenauer (1748–1835), Austrian architect
- Johann Lorenz von Hagenauer (1712–1792), Austrian merchant, landlord and friend of the Mozart family
- Karl Hagenauer (1898–1956), Austrian designer
- Nikolaus Hagenauer (c. 1445/60–1538), German sculptor
