= Dobrin, Sălaj =

Dobrin Debren
- Commune
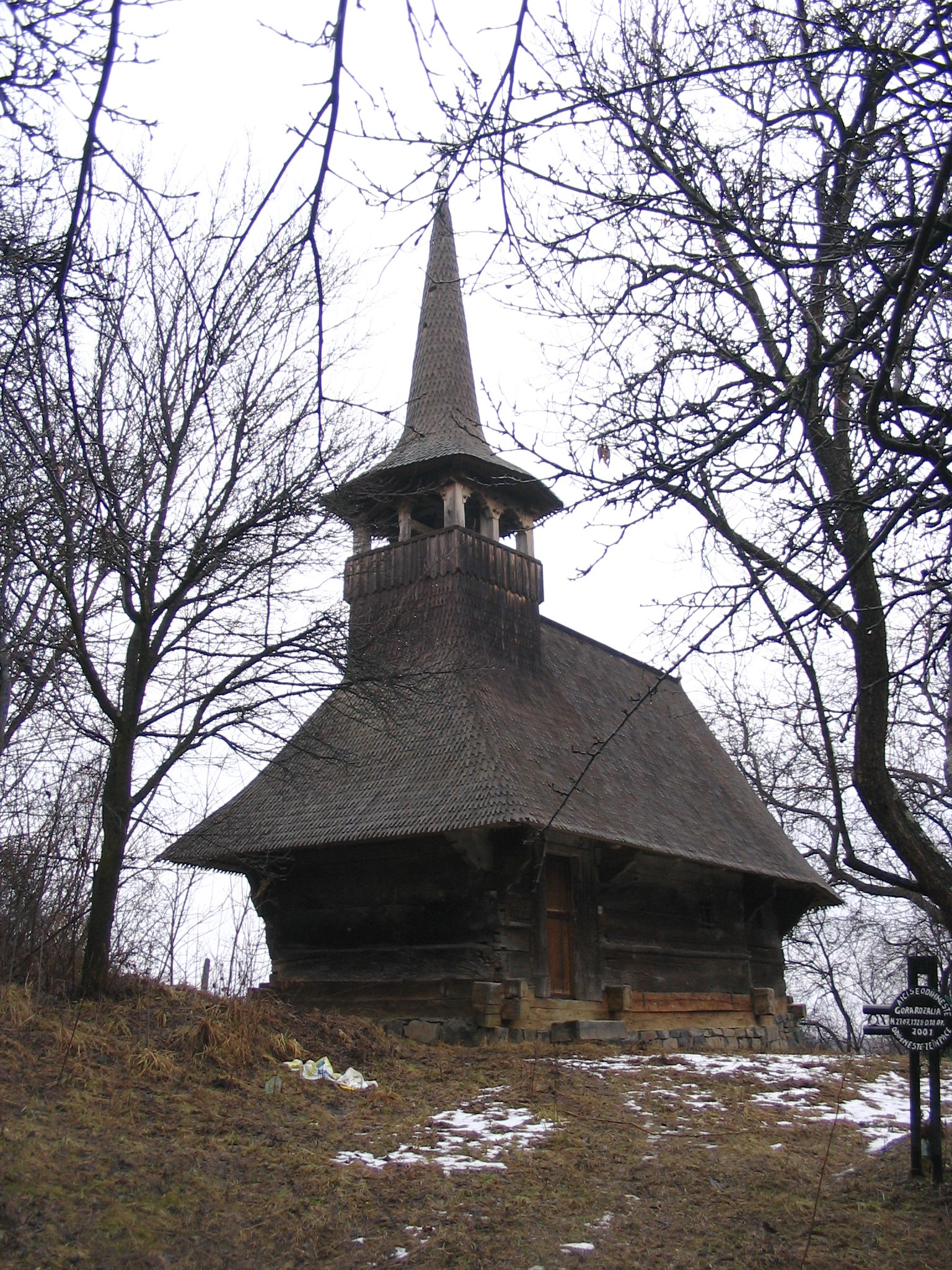
- Wooden Church in Doba Mică

- Coat of arms

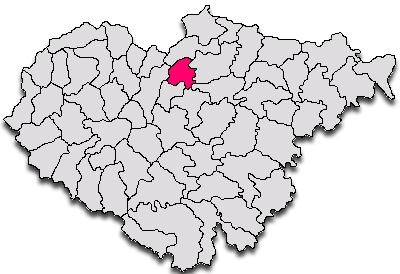
- Location in Sălaj County

- Location in Romania
- Coordinates: 47°17′45″N 23°7′45″E
- Country: Romania
- County: Sălaj

Government
  - Mayor (2020–2024): Ferenc István Bogdán (UDMR)
- Area: 40 km^{2} (15 sq mi)
- Elevation: 286 m (938 ft)
- Population (2021-12-01): 1,573
  - Density: 39/km^{2} (100/sq mi)
- Time zone: UTC+02:00 (EET)
  - Summer (DST): UTC+03:00 (EEST)
- Postal code: 457120
- Area code: +(40) 0260
- Vehicle reg.: SJ
- Website: comunadobrin.ro

Dobrin (Hungarian: Debren) is a commune located in Sălaj County, Crișana, Romania. It is composed of six villages: Deleni (Nagymonújfalu), Doba (Nagydoba), Dobrin, Naimon (Nagymon), Sâncraiu Silvaniei (Szilágyszentkirály), and Verveghiu (Vérvölgy).

Doba Mică (Kisdoba) is a hamlet in Doba village and a former fief of the Dobai family. It features a 17th-century wooden church.

At the 2021 census, the commune had a population of 1,723; of those, 73.55% were Hungarians, 21.61% Romanians, and 2.03% Roma.

== Sights ==
- Wooden Church in Doba Mică, built in the 17th century, historic monument
- Wooden Church in Dobrin, built in the 18th century (1720), historic monument
- Reformed Church in Doba Mică, built in the 19th century (1830)
