= Hornbostel =

Hornbostel is a German surname. Notable people with the surname include:

- Chuck Hornbostel (1911–1989), American middle-distance runner
- Erich Moritz von Hornbostel (1877–1935), Austrian ethnomusicologist
  - Hornbostel-Sachs, a classification system for musical instruments
- Henry Hornbostel (1867–1961), American architect
