= Schey =

Schey is a surname. Notable people with the surname include:

- Gilles Schey (1644–1703), Dutch admiral
- Hermann Schey (1895–1981) German-born Dutch bass-baritone and voice teacher
- Pips Schey (1881–1957), Austro-Hungarian baron
- William Schey (1857–1913), Australian politician
