= Huyn =

Grave of Countess Henriette Huyn (1786–1862) in St. Marx Cemetery, Vienna

Huyn is a surname. Notable people with the surname include:

- Gottfried Huyn von Geleen (died 1657), Dutch fieldmarshal
- Karl Georg Huyn (1857–1938), Austro-Hungarian colonel general
- Pavel Huyn (1868–1946), Moravian-German Roman Catholic clergyman
