= Falkenhayn =

Falkenhayn and von Falkenhayn may refer to:

- Benita von Falkenhayn (1900–1935), a Swiss-born German baroness who was a spy for Poland
- Charles-Gustave de Falkenhayn (1724–????), French general
- Erich von Falkenhayn (1861–1922), Chief of the German general staff 1914–1916.
- Eugen von Falkenhayn (1853–1934), German General of the Cavalry

Category:German noble families
