= Puppi =

Puppi is an Italian surname. Notable people with the surname include:

- Francesco Puppi (born 1992), Italian long-distance runner
- Giampietro Puppi (1917–2006), Italian physicist
- Lionello Puppi (1931–2018), Italian art historian and politician
- Paolo Renato Puppi (born 1999), writer

== See also ==
- Puppis, a constellation in the southern sky
- Puppi, a titular bishopric in Tunisia identified with the former Roman town of Pupput
