= Helfer (surname) =

Helfer (German for "helper", also "ally" or "personal assistant") is a German surname. Notable people with the surname include:

- Al Helfer (1911–1975), American sportscaster
- Andy Helfer (born 1958), American comics writer
- Erwin Helfer (born 1936), American pianist
- Johann Wilhelm Helfer (1810–1840), Bohemian scientist
- Laurence Helfer (born 1965), American lawyer
- Monika Helfer (1947–2026), Austrian writer
- Ralph Helfer (born 1931), American animal behaviorist
- Tricia Helfer (born 1974), Canadian actress

== See also ==
- Charles d'Helfer (1598–1661), French composer
- Helfer, rank
