= Von Trapp children =

Von Trapp children may refer to:

- the family in the musical The Sound of Music and the film based on it
- the musical group The von Trapps
