= Leonhardi =

Leonhardi is a surname. Notable people with the surname include:

- Eduard Leonhardi (1828–1905), German painter
- Johann Gottfried Leonhardi (1746–1823), German physician and chemist
- Moritz von Leonhardi (1856–1910), German anthropologist

== See also ==
- Aristotelia leonhardi, a moth of the family Gelechiidae
- Monopeltis leonhardi (Kalahari worm lizard), a worm lizard species in the family Amphisbaenidae
- Leonardi (disambiguation)
