= Natalie Gaupp =

American playwright (born 1967)

Natalie Gaupp (born January 8, 1967) is an American playwright.

Gaupp's professional production credits include theatres primarily in the Southwestern United States as well as off-off-Broadway. Her plays have also been workshopped in Toronto, New York City, and Chicago by the Association for Theatre in Higher Education.

Among her playwriting honors, Gaupp has received the Southwest Theatre and Film Association's "Best New Play" award for Powerful People and for Some of These Days (--as well as SWTFA's Oscar G. Brockett Theatre History Award).

Gaupp's plays have been published by SWTFA and by the Association for Theatre in Higher Education's New Play Development Workshop.
