= Stefano Bakonyi =

Hungarian writer

Dr. Stefano Bakonyi (1892–1969) was a Hungarian writer, consultant, and pioneering engineer. Bakonyi was born near Budapest into a family of modest means. After completing the classic gymnasium, he studied chemistry as a student worker. Between 1914 and 1918, he served in the Hungarian army. He suffered a serious cranio-cerebral injury during this time. After recovering, he worked for an extended period in German industry as well as in English speaking countries. He became a consultant and remained in this specialization when he later went into business on his own. He remained active in this profession for the remainder of his life.

During World War II, the Bakonyi family lived in Bordighera, a city occupied by Nazi forces. Stefano Bakonyi became involved in the international language movement, first as an Esperantist and later, in turn, as an Idist, an Occidentalist, and an Interlinguist. Among his publications was a book about Interlingua and the history of universal language titled Civilization e Lingua Universal. A month before his death, he founded the Foundation Bakonyi pro Lingua Universal in Lucerne Switzerland to underwrite Interlingua publications.
