= Baselli =

Baselli is an Italian surname. Notable people with the surname include:

- Alberto Valdivia Baselli (born 1977), Peruvian poet, writer, and literary scholar
- Daniele Baselli (born 1992), Italian footballer
