= Prausnitz =

Prausnitz is a German language surname. Notable people with the surname include:

- Frederik Prausnitz (1920–2004), German-born American conductor and teacher
- John Prausnitz (born 1928), American professor of chemical engineering
- Mark Prausnitz, American chemical engineer, scientist, educator, entrepreneur, and inventor; son of the above John Prausnitz
- Moshe Prausnitz (1922–1998), Israeli archaeologist
- Otto Prausnitz (1876–1963), German physician, bacteriologist, and hygienist
- Wilhelm Prausnitz (1861–1933), Prussia born, Austrian-German professor
- Prusice (German: Prausnitz), town in Lower Silesia, Poland
