= Karl Stefan Aichelburg =

Austrian musician (1782–1817)

Karl Stefan Aichelburg (22 February 1782 – 6 December 1817) (German: Karl Stefan Freiherr von Aichelburg. Also Charles, Baron d'Aichelbourg) was a mandolin virtuoso and composer who lived at the beginning of the nineteenth century in Vienna and there wrote Opus 1, Potpourri for mandolin (or violin) and guitar, Opus 2, Variations for mandolin and guitar, Opus 3, Nocturne concertantes for mandolin and guitar and Opus 4, Variations concertantes for mandolin and guitar. The above compositions were published by Haslinger, Vienna.

Also known as Karl Stefan, Baron of Aichelbourg. He was born in Vienna to an artistic family.

== Compositions ==
- Variationen über ein beliebtes Thema aus der Oper "Die Schweizerfamilie"
- Variationen über ein eigenes Thema op. 2; für Mandoline und Gitarre
- Variationen über ein eigenes Thema
- Variationen über ein beliebtes Thema aus der Oper "Die Schweizerfamilie" für Mandoline und Gitarre
- Notturno op. 3 für Mandoline und Gitarre
- Notturni, Md Git op. 3

== See also ==
- Academic paper on Aichelburg and his music (in German)
