= Kornis =

Kornis (also spelled Körniş) is a surname. Notable people with the name are:

- Attila Kornis (born 1989), Hungarian football
- Ayhan Kartal (né Korniş; 1966–2000), Turkish rapist and child killer
- György Kornis (1927–2011), Hungarian painter
- Gyula Kornis (1885–1958), Hungarian politician

== See also ==
- Kornis Castle
