= Hackinger =

Name of old Austrian noble family

The Hackinger family, or von Hacking, is an old Austrian noble family (ritter or knight).

== History ==
The earliest documented use of the name was by Marcwardus de Hakkingin in 1156, a follower of the House of Babenberg, who named himself after the town of Hacking, which is now part of Vienna. It was also noted that the family was exceptionally large; over 100 members of the knighthood have been documented at the monastery in Klosterneuburg. Another early member was referenced in 1168 as Gerungus de Hakeing.

Their origins prior to this is unknown, except that they had various landholdings and fiefdoms in the central Vienna valley (Wiental). Since the offspring of the Hackinger family also carried the title, indicates this was a hereditary line of knights.

The family would also construct the fortress of Hacking (Veste Hacking) in the middle of the 13th century due to its strategic location. Hacking was the seat of this knightly family until the 13th century when the Russbachers purchased the land. Where the family seat moved at this time is unknown.

Around, 1263, under Ottokar II of Bohemia, Tiemo von Russbach, son of Wernard von Russbach, changes his name to Tiemo von Hacking. This is the same year he took ownership of Hacking. His wife also takes on the name of Agnes von Hacking. Tiemo and his brother Gundaker would also use von Hacking as late as 1293. This is the last time this specific family line can be found in historical sources, and may have ended here or reverted to the Russbach name. Regardless, this newer Hackinger line had no relation to the older Hackinger line.

The von Hacking family was linked by marriage with the Greiff family through Elisabeth von Hacking, daughter of Heinrich von Hacking, who married Otto Grief. The Greiffs were known to be a very wealthy Viennese family, also knights. There was also a very close connection with the Burggrafen (burgraves) von Gars the depth of which is unknown. All that is known is that Erkenbert von Gars expresses a very close connection with the von Hacking family.

Between the 14th and 16th centuries records indicate numerous properties and land rights owned by the family. These lands include areas such as Auhof, Heiligenkreuz, Mauerbach, Schönbühel, Ranzenbach, Hilprechting, Hohenberg, Klammhof, Saag, Klosterneuburg, Uttendorf, and Ochsenburg. The most notable was Wilhelm von Hacking who owned several lands in upper Austria (Oberösterreich), many of which were given to him by Albert II of Germany (Archduke Albert V of Austria).

In 1451, Georg Hackinger helped form the Mailberger Bund at Mailberg Castle, an alliance against King Frederick III in a dispute over the rightful reign of Ladislaus the Posthumous.

The Hackinger name virtually vanishes from records until the 18th and 19th centuries, when it reappears with the greatest density in areas such as Austria (notably Upper Austria, Styria, and Burgenland) and Niederbayern, Germany. Names have also been found in Sopron, Hungary. The name continues to the present day in these areas.

The disappearance of the name from records in the 16th century is not unusual. During the period known as the Military Revolution (1550–1660), nobles gradually lost their role in raising and commanding private armies, as many nations created cohesive national armies. This was coupled with a loss of the socio-economic power of the nobility, owing to the economic changes of the Renaissance and the growing economic importance of the merchant classes, which increased still further during the Industrial Revolution. In countries where the nobility was the dominant class, rich city merchants came to be more influential than noblemen, and the latter sometimes sought inter-marriage with families of the former to maintain their noble lifestyles.

Today the Hackinger name is rare and highly concentrated in the specific areas mentioned previously, as such it is likely these are the offspring of the noble family.

== Coat of arms ==
The coat of arms is described as a shield that is diagonally divided in the middle with a yellow or golden field above. In the field is the white head of a wolf and its throat; its mouth open. The bottom half of the shield is a single blue field. On top of the shield is a closed helmet. On top of the helmet are two buffalo horns with alternating stripes of yellow and blue. In between the horns is a wolf head. The helmet cover is yellow and blue.

== Family Members ==
Hackingers mentioned throughout history, and years their names were recorded:

=== Hackinger Line ===
- Markward (Marquard) von Hacking (de Hakkingin) (1156 1180, 1200)
- Engelbert von Hacking (1178, 1186)
- Wolcher von Hacking (1178, 1186)
- Wichpert von Hacking (1178, 1186)
- Engeldie von Hacking (1180, 1200)
- Anshalm von Hacking (1180, 1200)
- Gerung von Hacking (1180, 1200)
- Ulrich von Hacking (1178, 1180, 1186, 1200)
- Heinrich von Hacking (1208, 1217, 1264)
- Oertl (Ortlieb) von Hacking (1247)
- Otto von Hacking (1178, 1186, 1230, 1288, 1294)
- Margareth von Hacking (1300)
- Wolfger von Hacking (1306, 1320)
- Elisabeth (Elsbeth) von Hacking (1370)
- Wilhelm Hackinger (von Hacking) (1404, 1411)
- Hertl von Hacking (1405)
- Nicolaus Hackinger von Hilprechting (1411)
- Rudl (Rudolph) von Hacking (date unknown)
- Cathray von Hacking (date unknown)
- Georg Hackinger (1451, 1484)
- Jörg Hackinger (1458)
- Johann (Hanns) Hackinger (1474
- Wolfgang Hackinger (1484, 1492, 1500, 1508)

=== Russbach-Hackinger Line ===
- Thiemo von Hacking (1291)
- Agnes von Hacking (1291)

== Sources ==
- Quellen zur Geschichte der Stadt Wien: t. Texte und Register bearb. von F. Staub. 1921
- Hacking an der Wien – Hakkingin https://www.1133.at/document/view/id/761
- Hacking https://www.1133.at/document/view/id/766
- Das Hackinger Schloss https://www.1133.at/document/view/id/604
- Schauplatz des landsässigen Nieder-Oesterreichischen Adels vom Herren- und Ritterstande, von dem XI. Jahrhundert an, bis auf jetzige Zeiten von Franz Karl Wissgrill. 1794
- Sammlung historischer Schriften und Urkunden: Geschöpft aus Handschriften, Volume 3 1830
- Historische und topographische Darstellung Pfarren, Stifte, Klöster, milden Stiftungen und Denkmähler im Erzherzogthume Oeſterreich. 1824
- Studien zum mittelalterlichen Adel im Tullnerfeld von Günter Marian. 2015
