= Saeger =

Saeger (German pronunciation: [ˈzɛgɐ]) is a German surname that may refer to

- Edward Saeger, German-American settler
  - Edward Saeger House in Crawford County, Pennsylvania, U.S.
- Orpheus Saeger Woodward (1835–1919), Union Army officer during American Civil War
- Richard Saeger (born 1964), American swimmer
