= Peter von Tramin =

Austrian writer

Peter Richard Oswald Freiherr von Tschugguel zu Tramin, known under the pen names Peter von Tramin and Peter von Kleynn, (9 May 1932 – 14 July 1981) was an Austrian writer.

== Biography ==
Tschugguel was born on 9 May 1932 in Vienna. He studied law and then worked as a bank clerk and translator.

Tschugguel was a short story writer and novelist.

In 1963, he won an Austrian State Prize for Literature.

Tschugguel died on 14 July 1981.

== Bibliography ==
=== Novels ===
- Herr über 10000 Gehirne, 1958
- Die Herren Söhne, 1962
- Die Tür im Fenster, 1967

=== Short stories ===
- Divertimento, 1963
- Taschen voller Geld und andere Erzählungen, 1970
- Der Kanalrat, 1974
