= Döderlein =

Döderlein may refer to:

== People ==
- Johann Christoph Döderlein (1745–1792), theologian at Jena
- Johann Christoph Wilhelm Ludwig Döderlein (1791–1863), philologist
- Lera Doederlein (born 2003), American sledge hockey player
- Ludwig Heinrich Philipp Döderlein (1855–1936), zoologist and paleontologist
- Albert Döderlein (1860–1941), obstetrician and gynecologist

== Other uses ==
- "Döderlein", a song by Norwegian rock group Seigmen on the album Total
