= Fritz Tarbuk von Sensenhorst =

Austrian businessman (1896–1976)

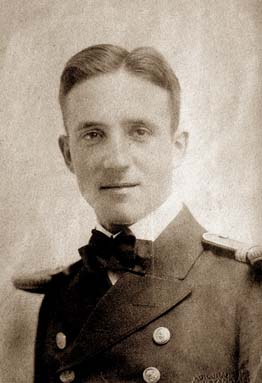
Fritz Tarbuk von Sensenhorst

Friedrich Maria "Fritz" Tarbuk von Sensenhorst (16 August 1896 – 1 March 1976), also known as Friedrich Maria von Tarbuk-Sensenhorst, was a lieutenant in the Imperial Austro-Hungarian Navy and captain in the Army, as well as an entrepreneur/businessman (founded F.M. Tarbuk & Co.), one of the most important businesses in the motor trade in Austria and CEE until the beginning of the 21st century.

== Family ==
Tarbuk's family was of Austrian and Croatian descent, having been settled as military farmers on the Austrian border with the Ottoman Empire in the Balkans. His father, Johann Tarbuk von Sensenhorst was field marshal in the Austro-Hungarian Army; his mother was Mathilde Josefa Bayrhammer Edle von Sensenhorst.

"Fritz" had 4 brothers:

- Karl Tarbuk von Sensenhorst (general in the Austrian Army, later field marshal in the German Wehrmacht)
- Hans Tarbuk von Sensenhorst (Gen.-Colonel in the Austrian Army, later General in the German Wehrmacht)
- Robert Tarbuk von Sensenhorst (Colonel in the German Wehrmacht)
- Felix Tarbuk von Sensenhorst, (Colonel in the German Wehrmacht and Counter-Intelligence Officer)

The brothers had two sisters.

== Marriage ==
"Fritz" Tarbuk von Sensenhorst was married to Maria Librowicz (a native of Warsaw), the daughter of Aleksandr Librowicz and Bronisława von Lublinska. Fritz and Maria had no children.

== Business life ==
In 1920 Tarbuk founded the motor trading-house F. M. Tarbuk & Co. starting distribution in Austria for the German brands DKW, Horch, Audi and Wanderer of the German Auto Union AG as well as Mathis. In the 1930s he used his personal contacts with officers, diplomats and politicians to open a sales and workshop network in Austria and Slovakia.

In 1938 his partner Peter Pflaum joined the business. During World War II the Tarbuk-workshops in Vienna and Bratislava/Pressburg were working for the German Wehrmacht. During the time of petroleum shortage F. M. Tarbuk & Co. was the leading business in modifying motorcars to wood-gas burning (using the patented system of Georges Imbert).

After World War II, Tarbuk & Co. started sales and service networks for Aero, Praga, Škoda Auto, Tatra, Simca, Talbot, Rootes, Humber, Hillman, Sunbeam, Chrysler Corporation, Plymouth, Fargo, Dodge, Isuzu, Jensen Motors, Saab, Datsun/Nissan, MG Rover Group, Austin Motor Company, MG, Land Rover, Range Rover and Jaguar in Austria.

From 1950 a group of companies in Austria and her neighboring countries was built up with affiliated companies, workshops and sales outlets for 48 brands of the motor industry: Fiat, Lancia, Alfa Romeo, Ford, Volvo, Subaru, Mazda, Suzuki, Opel, Daewoo, Chevrolet, Messerschmitt-Fendt, Harley Davidson, Vespa, Ducati, Hiab, Atlas Weyhausen, Massey Ferguson, Deutz-Fahr, Fiat, Zetor, JCB, Case, Kubota, SAME, Mercedes-Benz Trac and Landini.

== Death ==
Friedrich Maria "Fritz" Tarbuk von Sensenhorst died in 1976, aged 79.

== Posthumous ==
After his death the business continued to flourish under the management by Peter Pflaum and Tarbuk's two nephews. The group of companies was later structured into the shareholding company TARBUK/AG in 1992 under Dr Mario Seiller-Tarbuk. Until the late 1990s the Tarbuk Group had 40 affiliated companies with over 1000 employees, and was one of the largest and most successful Austrian businesses.

== Downturn ==
Later it was hit by structural changes, the downturn of the motor industry and management mistakes by the end of the 1990s.

In 2003, Erhard F. Grossnigg joined as partner and troubleshooter, but it was possible only to keep a handful of car-dealerships, workshops and parts of the agricultural machine business (Deutz-Fahr Austria, Austro Diesel) open.
