= Spaun =

Spaun may refer to:

== People ==
- Hermann von Spaun (1833–1919), admiral in the Austro-Hungarian Navy
- J. J. Spaun (born 1990), American professional golfer
- Joseph von Spaun (1788–1865), Austrian nobleman, an Imperial and Royal Councillor

== Other ==
- SMS Admiral Spaun, scout cruiser built for the Austro-Hungarian Navy, named after Hermann von Spaun
- Spaun (Semantic Pointer Architecture Unified Network), a cognitive architecture

== See also ==
- Spaunton, a hamlet and civil parish in North Yorkshire, England
- Spawn (disambiguation)
