= Lieben =

Lieben may refer to:

- Libeň, Prague, Czech Republich
- Adolf Lieben (1836–1914), Austrian Jewish chemist
- Robert von Lieben, Austrian Jewish physicist
- Palais Lieben-Auspitz, a ring road in Vienna, Austria
