= Mattner =

Mattner is a surname. Notable people with the surname include:

- Martin Mattner (born 1982), Australian rules footballer
- Ted Mattner (1893–1977), Australian politician
