= Mauriello =

The surname Mauriello came from the personal name Mauro, which is itself derived from the Latin name Maurus. Notable people with the surname include:

- Francesco Mauriello (born 1993), Italian motorcycle racer
- Justin Mauriello (born 1975), American rock singer and guitarist
- Ralph Mauriello (born 1934), American baseball player
- Tami Mauriello (1923–1999), American boxer and actor
