= Michael Helfert =

Dr. Michael Helfert was a senior scientist at NASA's Lyndon B. Johnson Space Center, and acted as both scientist and chief scientist for Earth observations for Space Shuttle missions from 1982 through 2008. He was also the Director of the Southeast Regional Climate Center and the South Carolina state climatologist. He was also the Director of the U.S. Climate Reference Network (USCRN) at the National Climate Data Center.
