= Matuska =

Matuška (feminine: Matušková) is a Czech surname, derived from the given name Matouš. Matúška (feminine: Matúšková) is a Slovak surname, derived from the given name Matúš. The Germanized form of the surname is Matuschka. Notable people with the surnames include:

- Janko Matúška (1821–1877), Slovak poet, activist, and playwright
- Michael von Matuschka (1888–1944), German politician
- Szilveszter Matuska (1892–1945), Hungarian mass murderer and mechanical engineer
- Waldemar Matuška (1932–2009), Czechoslovak singer

== See also ==
- Matuschka (born Joanne Motichka), American photographer, artist, author, activist and model
