= Nemeshetés =

- Location of Nemeshetés
- Coordinates: 46.80268°N 16.91515°E
- Country: Hungary
- County: Zala

Area
  - Total: 6.76 km^{2} (2.61 sq mi)

Population (2001)
  - Total: 320
  - Density: 47/km^{2} (120/sq mi)
- Time zone: UTC+1 (CET)
  - Summer (DST): UTC+2 (CEST)
- Postal code: 8925
- Website: nemeshetes.hu

Nemeshetés is a village in Zala County, Hungary.
