= Mallmann =

Mallmann is a German surname. Notable people with the surname include:

- Francis Mallmann (born 1956), Argentine chef
- Joseph Mallmann (c. 1827 – 1886), German businessman
- Klaus-Michael Mallmann (born 1948), German writer
- Shirley Mallmann (born 1977), Brazilian model
- Wallyson Mallmann (born 1994), Brazilian footballer
