= Kuffner =

Kuffner or Küffner may refer to:

- Kuffner (surname)
- 12568 Kuffner (1998 VB5), a Main-belt Asteroid discovered in 1998
- Kuffner observatory, one of two telescope-equipped public observatories situated in Austria's capital, Vienna
- Palais Kuffner, city-palace in Vienna that was built for the brewery barons von Kuffner
