= Ferstl =

Ferstl is a surname. Notable people with the name include:

- Eberhard Ferstl (1933–2019), German field hockey player
- Josef Ferstl (born 1988), German alpine ski racer
- Karl Ferstl (born 1945), Austrian sailor
- Sepp Ferstl (born 1954), German alpine skier
