= Wacław Michał Zaleski =

Polish poet and writer

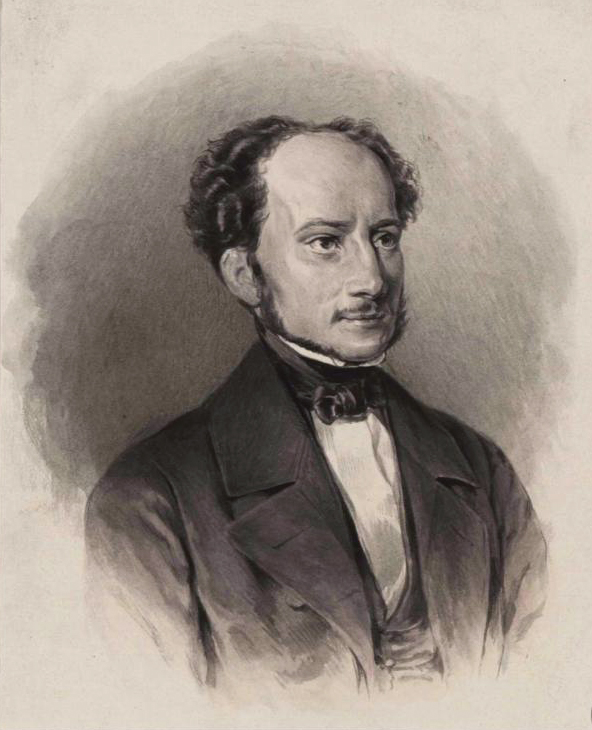
Wacław Michał Zaleski

Wacław Michał Zaleski (8 September 1799 – 24 February 1849), pseudonym Wacław from Olesko (Polish: Wacław z Oleska), was a Polish nobleman, poet, writer, researcher of folklore, theatre critic, political activist, and governor of Galicia (1848). Galician landowner and deputy to the Parliament.

== Life ==
Zaleski was born on 8 September 1799 in Olesko, eastern Galicia.

Zaleski collected and published in Lviv Pieśni polskie i ruskie ludu galicyjskiego (Polish and Russian songs of the Galician Nation; 1833), which contained about 1,500 works, including 160 with piano accompaniment composed by Karol Lipiński. It was the largest collection of folk songs published in Poland before Oskar Kolberg.

Zaleski was an author of patriotic songs, paraphrases, translations of Ukrainian dumas and never-published stage works.

Zaleski died on 24 February 1849 in Vienna.

His sons were Filip Zaleski (the governor of Galicia and the member of the Austrian House of Lords), Antoni (1842–1866, writer) and Józef Mieczysław (1838–1899, cavalryman, later commander of the division and field marshal). His grandson, Austrian Minister Wacław Michal Artur Zaleski, obtained the hereditary title of Austrian Count from Emperor Franz Joseph I.
