= Strachwitz =

Strachwitz is a German surname. Notable people with the name include:

- Chris Strachwitz (1931–2023), German-born American record label executive and record producer
- Ernst Graf Strachwitz (1919–1998), German Wehrmacht officer during World War II
- Hyacinth Graf Strachwitz (1893–1968), German Wehrmacht officer of aristocratic descent during World War II
- Mauritz Freiherr von Strachwitz (1898–1953), German general during World War II
- Moritz von Strachwitz (1822–1847), German lyric poet
