= Kottulinsky =

Kottulinsky is a Swedish surname. Notable people with the surname include:

- Freddy Kottulinsky (1932–2010), German-Swedish racing and rallying driver
- Mikaela Åhlin-Kottulinsky (born 1992), Swedish racing driver
