= Emo (name) =

Emo may refer to the following people

Given name

- Emo of Friesland (c. 1175–1237), Frisian scholar
- Emo de Medeiros (born 1979), French/Beninese artist
- Emo Philips (born 1956), American stand-up comedian
- Emo Welzl (born 1958), Austrian computer scientist

Surname

- Giorgio Emo (1644-1705), Archbishop of Corfu
- Angelo Emo (1731–1792), Admiral of the Republic of Venice
- E. W. Emo (1898–1975), Austrian film director
- Maria Emo, Austrian stage, film and television actress
