= Von Mises =

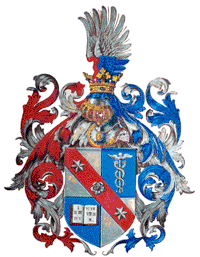
Coat of arms of Ludwig von Mises's great-grandfather, Mayer Rachmiel Mises, awarded upon his 1881 ennoblement by Franz Joseph I of Austria.

The Mises family or von Mises is the name of an Austrian noble family. Members of the family excelled especially in mathematics and economy.

== Notable members ==
- Ludwig von Mises, an Austrian-American economist of the Austrian School, older brother of Richard von Mises
  - Mises Institute, or the Ludwig von Mises Institute for Austrian Economics, named after Ludwig von Mises
- Richard von Mises, an Austrian-American scientist and mathematician, younger brother of Ludwig von Mises
  - Von Mises distribution, named after Richard von Mises
  - Von Mises yield criterion, named after Richard von Mises
- Dr. Mises, pseudonym of Gustav Fechner, a German philosopher, physicist and experimental psychologist.
