= Palais Gomperz =

Coordinates: 48°12′09″N 16°22′14″E

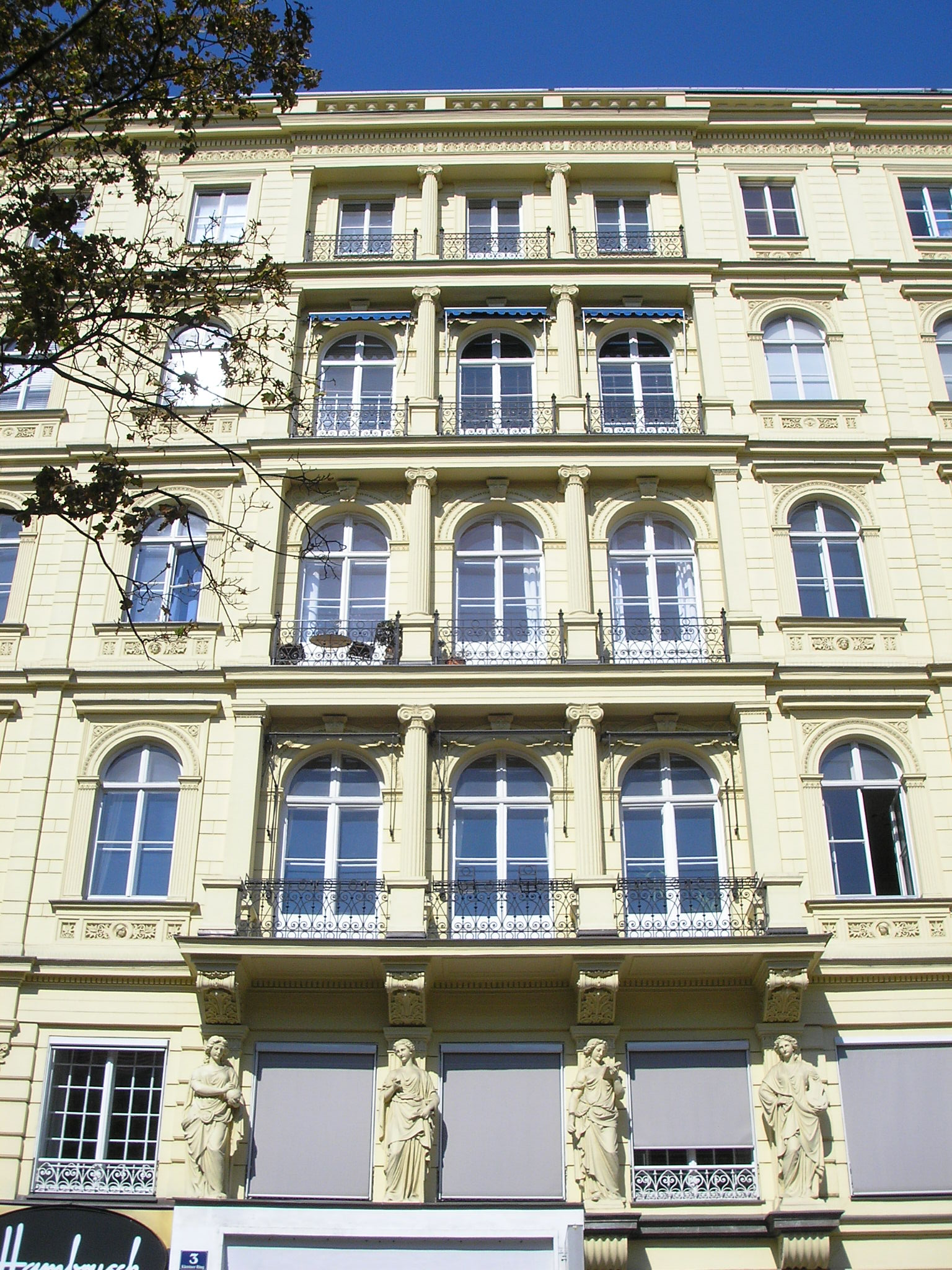
Palais Gomperz

Palais Gomperz is a Ringstraßenpalais in Vienna, Austria. It was built for the aristocratic Gomperz family.

== History ==
It was built by Ludwig Förster in 1860/61 and acquired by the brothers Julius and Max Gomperz, both of whom were successful bankers in Vienna. They were important actors in the economic life of the monarchy. Julius Gomperz was a member of the Moravian state parliament, sat in the Reichsrat from 1871/72, was president of the Brno Jewish community from 1872, became a hereditary member of the Austrian manor and in 1879 was raised to the nobility. Max Gomperz became Vice President of the Brno Chamber of Commerce in 1850. In 1858 he moved to Vienna, became a member of the board of directors, president and honorary president of the Creditanstalt für Handel und Gewerbe, ran a bank, was president of the Bohemian Western Railway and the Prager Eisen-Industriegesellschaft and was raised to the nobility in 1877.

== Architecture ==
The palace is built in Historic architecture . It has six floors. There are several shops on the ground floor. Four statues are set up under the balcony on the second floor, symbolizing the four muses (dance, poetry, painting, music).
