= Schönegg =

Schönegg, Schoenegg or Schonegg may refer to:

- Schönegg, Upper Austria, a municipality in the district of Rohrbach in Upper Austria, Austria
- Schönegg, Zug, a suburb of the city of Zug in the canton of Zug, Switzerland
- Schönegg bei Pöllau, a municipality in the district of Hartberg in Styria, Austria
