= Stubenberg, Styria =

Municipality in Austria

Stubenberg
- Municipality
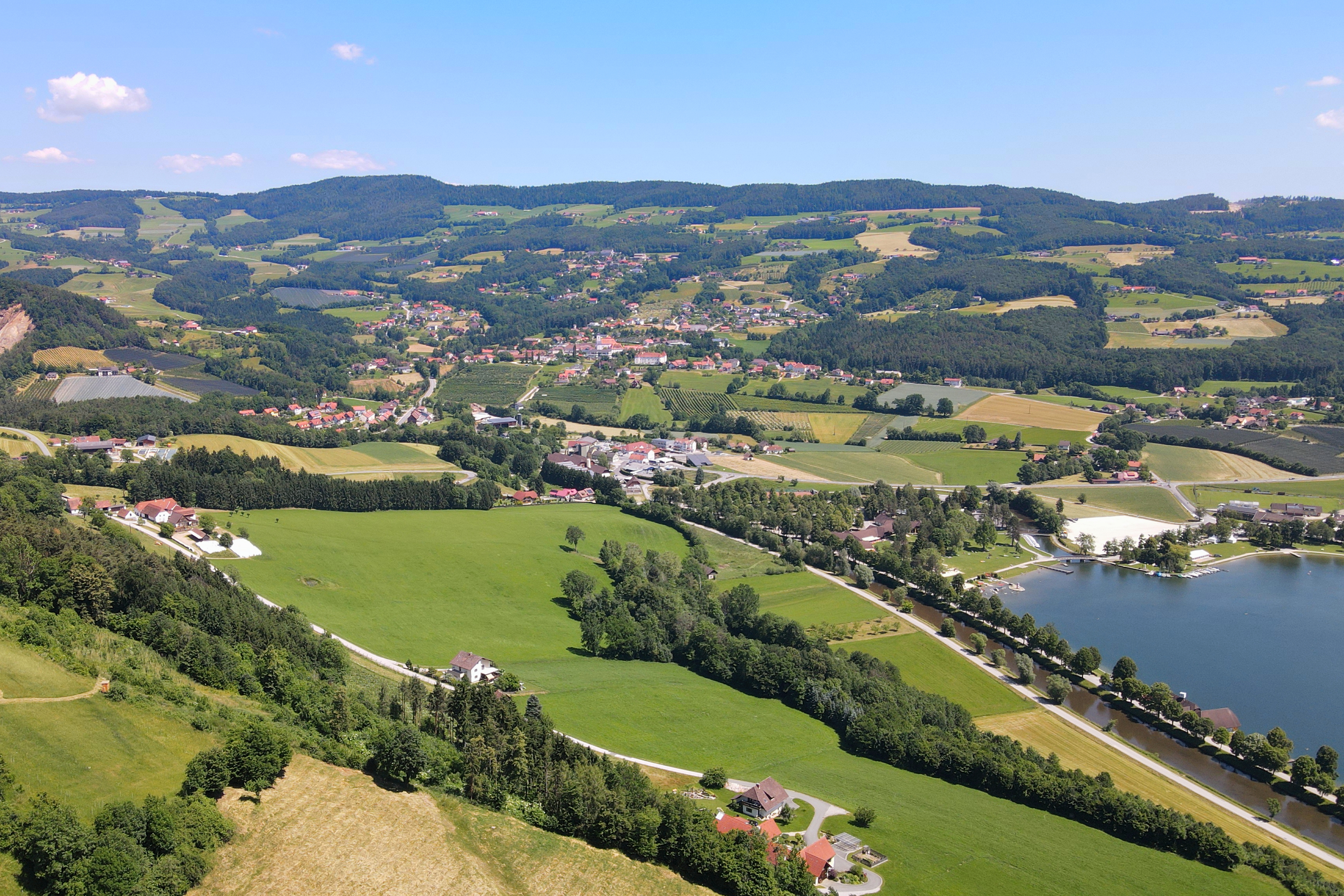
- Aerial view of Stubenberg

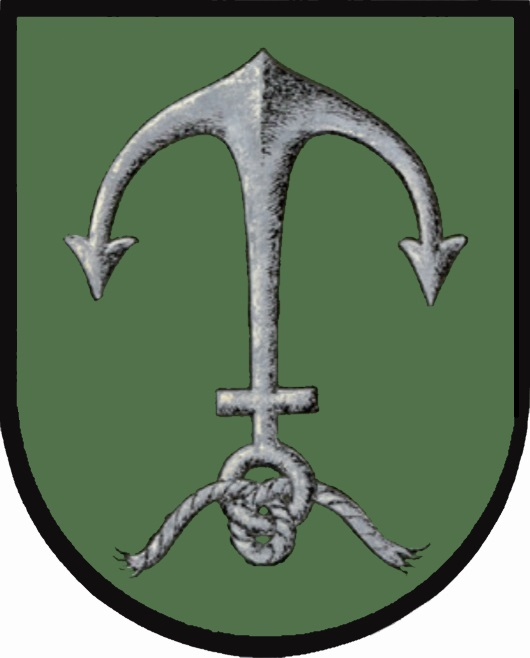
- Coat of arms

- Location within Austria
- Coordinates: 47°14′00″N 15°48′00″E
- Country: Austria
- State: Styria
- District: Hartberg-Fürstenfeld

Government
  - Mayor: Franz Hofer (ÖVP)

Area
  - Total: 32.59 km^{2} (12.58 sq mi)
- Elevation: 449 m (1,473 ft)

Population (2018-01-01)
  - Total: 2,171
  - Density: 66.62/km^{2} (172.5/sq mi)
- Time zone: UTC+1 (CET)
  - Summer (DST): UTC+2 (CEST)
- Postal code: 8223
- Area code: 03176
- Vehicle registration: HB
- Website: www.stubenberg. steiermark.at

Stubenberg (Austrian German pronunciation: [ˈʃtuːbn̩ˌbɛrɡ]), called Stubenberg am See, is a municipality in the district of Hartberg-Fürstenfeld, in Styria, Austria. It is located roughly 50 km from Graz and 200 km from Vienna. It has a population of 2.287 as of April 2010.

== Emblem ==
The emblem of Stubenberg shows ideas of the emblem of the noble family of Stubenberg, which was named after the castle located within the area of Stubenberg. The toppled anchor resembles the silvery Wolfsangel of the emblem of the nobles; the background was replaced though, showing the green-white colors of Styria now.

== Geography ==
Stubenberg is located in the valley of Feistritz, on the south-east of the Alps. The municipality extends between 386 and 1282 meters above sea level.

=== Climate ===
Due to its position southeast of the Alps, Stubenberg is shielded from the prevailing westerly winds that bring weather fronts in from the North Atlantic to northwestern and central Europe.

Climate data for Stubenberg, Austria
Month	Jan	Feb	Mar	Apr	May	Jun	Jul	Aug	Sep	Oct	Nov	Dec	Year
Mean daily maximum °F (°C)	35 (2)	42 (6)	52 (11)	62 (17)	72 (22)	78 (26)	80 (27)	77 (25)	70 (21)	59 (15)	47 (8)	35 (2)	59.083 (15.05)
Mean daily minimum °F (°C)	20 (−7)	22 (−6)	29 (−2)	38 (3)	46 (8)	55 (13)	56 (13)	55 (13)	47 (8)	40 (4)	33 (1)	26 (−3)	38.916 (3.84)
Source: <World Weather Online >"Stubenberg Climate Weather Averages". Stubenberg Monthly Climate Average, Austria. World Weather Online. 2016.

=== Districts ===
Stubenberg is divided into 5 districts. They are:

- Buchberg, 452 ha (231 inhabitants)
- Freienberg, 544 ha (293 inhabitants)
- Stubenberg, 789 ha (622 inhabitants)
- Vockenberg, 630 ha (440 inhabitants)
- Zeil-Stubenberg, 841 ha (670 inhabitants)

=== Neighbouring municipalities ===
The following villages border Stubenberg (starting from north):

- Rabenwald
- Schönegg bei Pöllau
- Tiefenbach bei Kaindorf
- Sankt Johann bei Herberstein
- Siegersdorf bei Herberstein
- Puch bei Weiz
- Floing

== Population ==
=== Population development ===
Since the first census 1869, resulting in 1,772 inhabitants, the number of inhabitants did rise almost year-to-year (with a sharp decline of 4.9% from 1934 to 1939) up to 2,325. Reaching a peak in 1991 the most recent number (2010) is slightly down, at 2,287.

=== Religions ===
The vast majority (95.4%) of the inhabitants are members of the Catholic Church; 0.8% belong to the Protestantism and about 0.4% are attributed to Islam. 2.1% of the inhabitants do not belong to any religious group. A Roman Catholic parish is located in Stubenberg.

== Economy ==
A major source of income for Stubenberg is tourism, mainly in the summer season. The village can account for more than 150 thousand overnight stays. In addition, many visitors take day trips to Stubenberg, especially to its lake providing water sports facilities or to Schloss Herberstein. There is no industrial production located in the vicinity, small companies mainly provide for local demand. 14 percent of persons employed are within the agricultural sector. The service sector dominates with 52%.

Stubenberg hosted the 1986 European Hot Air Balloon Championships, at the grounds of Schloss Schielleiten. The balloon event was held there again in 1996.

== Main sights ==
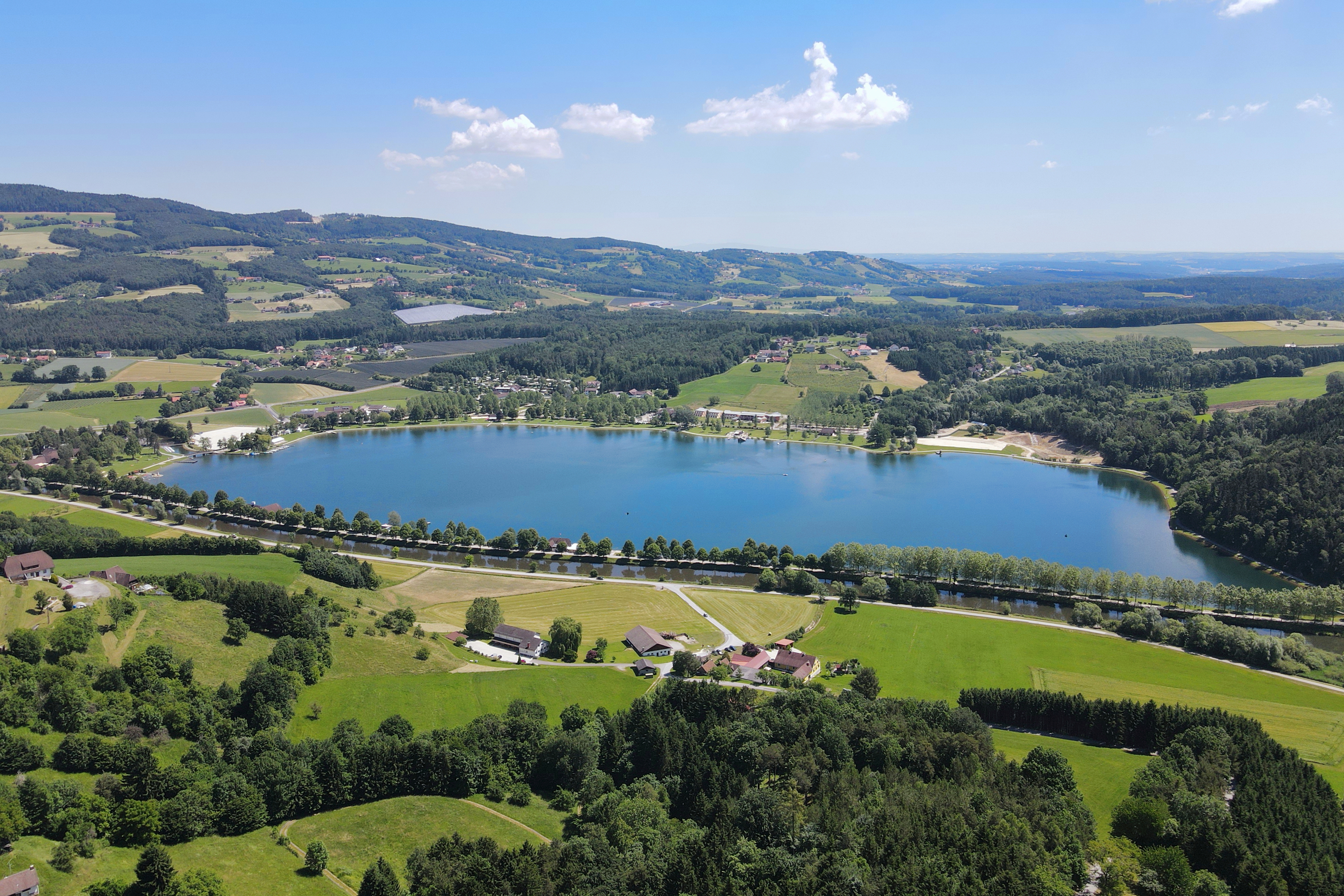
Stubenbergsee

- Schloss Stubenberg (16th century), home of a hotel and a taverne and hosting cultural events
- Schloss Schielleiten, late-baroque, home of a state-owned sports-school with extended sports fields (tennis, soccer, athletics)
- Altschielleiten, ruin near castle Schielleiten
- Stubenberg is located near the Styrian Schlösserstraße and the Styrian Apfelstraße
- Lake Stubenberg, an artificial lake, with different recreational facilities
- Tier- und Naturpark Schloss Herberstein with Schloss Herberstein
- Castle Neuhaus
