= Herberstein Zoo =

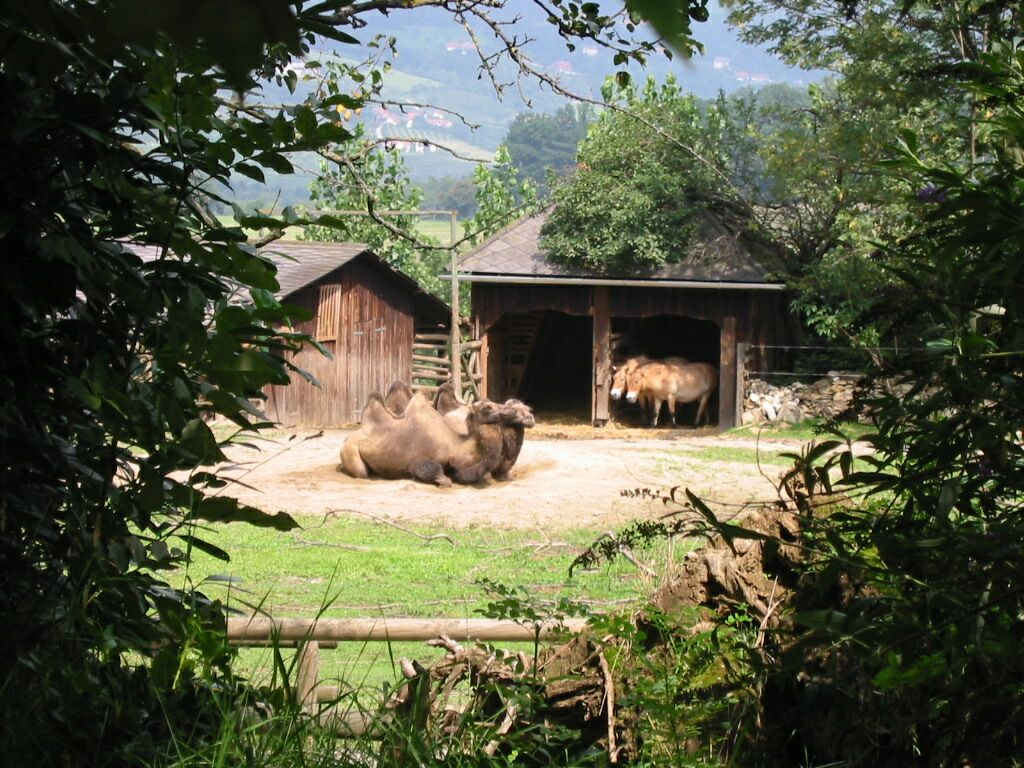
- Interactive map of Herberstein Zoo
- 47°13′09″N 15°48′45″E
- Date opened: end of 1960´s
- Location: A 8223 Stubenberg am See, Buchberg 50, Austria
- Owner: Steirischer Landestiergarten GmbH
- Website: http://www.tierwelt-herberstein.at/

Herberstein Zoo (German: Tierwelt Herberstein) is a zoo at Schloss Herberstein in Styria, Austria.

Due to the steep slopes around the castle Herberstein, count Johann Maximilian I zu Herberstein chose to give up the idea of keeping cattle around the castle, and he chose to bring fallow deer from Italy, to browse the environment around the castle and this became the origin of the present zoo.

In 1888, the area for fenced animals was increased and in the end of 1960, the zoo started to keep exotic animals and opened their gates for the public.
