= Stubenberg family =

Austrian noble family

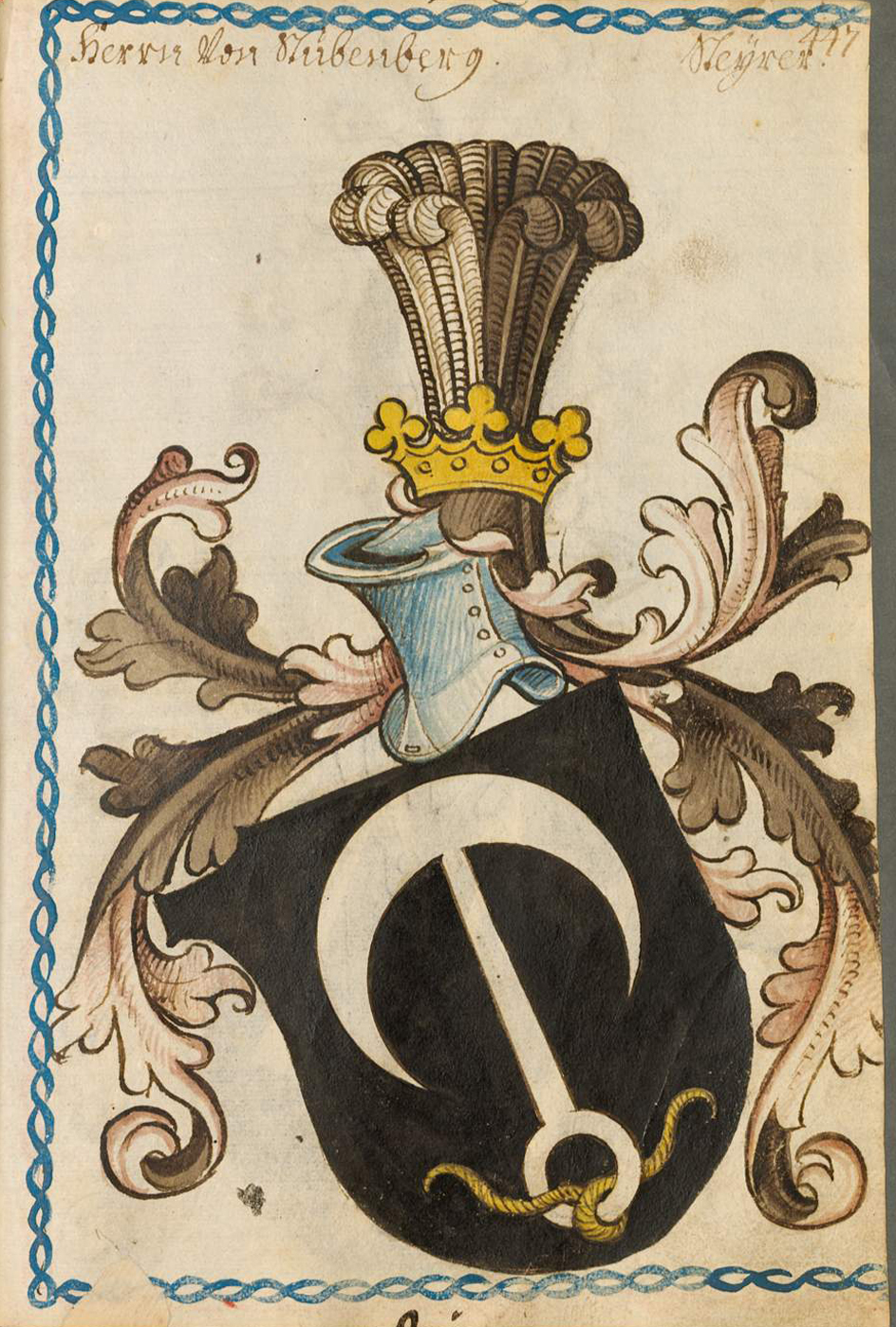
Coat of arms, Scheiblersches Wappenbuch, c. 1450–80

The House of Stubenberg is the name of an old Austrian noble family from Pitten documented since about 1160, with its ancestral seat at Stubenberg, Styria. Members of the family held important posts in the Habsburg monarchy and had hereditary membership in the Hungarian House of Magnates.

== History ==
Originally from Pitten in present-day Lower Austria, the family's ancestors took their residence at Stubenberg in the March of Styria about 1160. One Ulrich of Stubenberg is documented as a participant of the Fifth Crusade, killed at Damietta in 1218. The Stubenbergs established contacts to the rising House of Habsburg at an early stage and revolted against the rule of King Ottokar II of Bohemia, who finally was defeated by his Habsburg rival King Rudolf I of Germany in the 1278 Battle on the Marchfeld. Under Habsburg rule, the family members were able to restore their devastated estates; in the mid 14th century they had Neuhaus Castle (Burg Neuhaus) erected near Stubenberg and built Stubenberg Castle as their new residence.

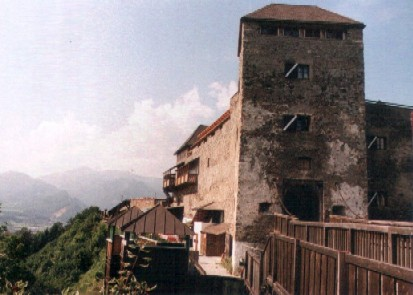
Oberkapfenberg

However, about one hundred years later, the Stubenbergs fought against the Habsburg Emperor Frederick III side by side with the Hungarian king Matthias Corvinus. Once Frederick had prevailed, the Stubenberg possessions were seized and the dynasty retired to their estates in Gutenberg and at Oberkapfenberg in Upper Styria. From 1739 the Styrian branch of the family resided in the town of Kapfenberg.

In 1548 one Wolfgang von Stubenberg acquired the estates of Nové Město nad Metují (Neustadt an der Mettau) in Bohemia from the heirs of late governor John III of Pernstein. The Stubenbergs had the local castle rebuilt in a lavish Renaissance style and became notable members of the Protestant Bohemian nobility. Upon the 1618 Bohemian Revolt against the Habsburg archduke Ferdinand II and the Battle of the White Mountain, the Nové Město estates were seized and ceded to Albrecht von Wallenstein. Likewise, when Ferdinand II, Holy Roman Emperor since 1619, had the Protestant nobles expelled from the Habsburg hereditary lands, several members of the Styrian Stubenbergs went into exile in the Electorate of Saxony or in the imperial cities of Nuremberg and Regensburg.

== Notable members ==
- Wulfing von Stubenberg (1259–1318), Bishop of Lavant and Archbishop of Bamberg
- Joseph von Stubenberg (1740–1824), Bishop of Eichstätt and Archbishop of Bamberg
- Maria Anna Stubenberg (1821-1912), composer

=== Styrian governors ===
- Jakob von Stubenberg, Landeshauptmann 1418–1419
- Hans von Stubenberg, Landeshauptmann 1435–1450
- Leutold von Stubenberg, Landeshauptmann 1453–1470
- Georg von Stubenberg, Landeshauptmann 1687–1703
