= Bruno Gironcoli =

Austrian artist (1936–2010)

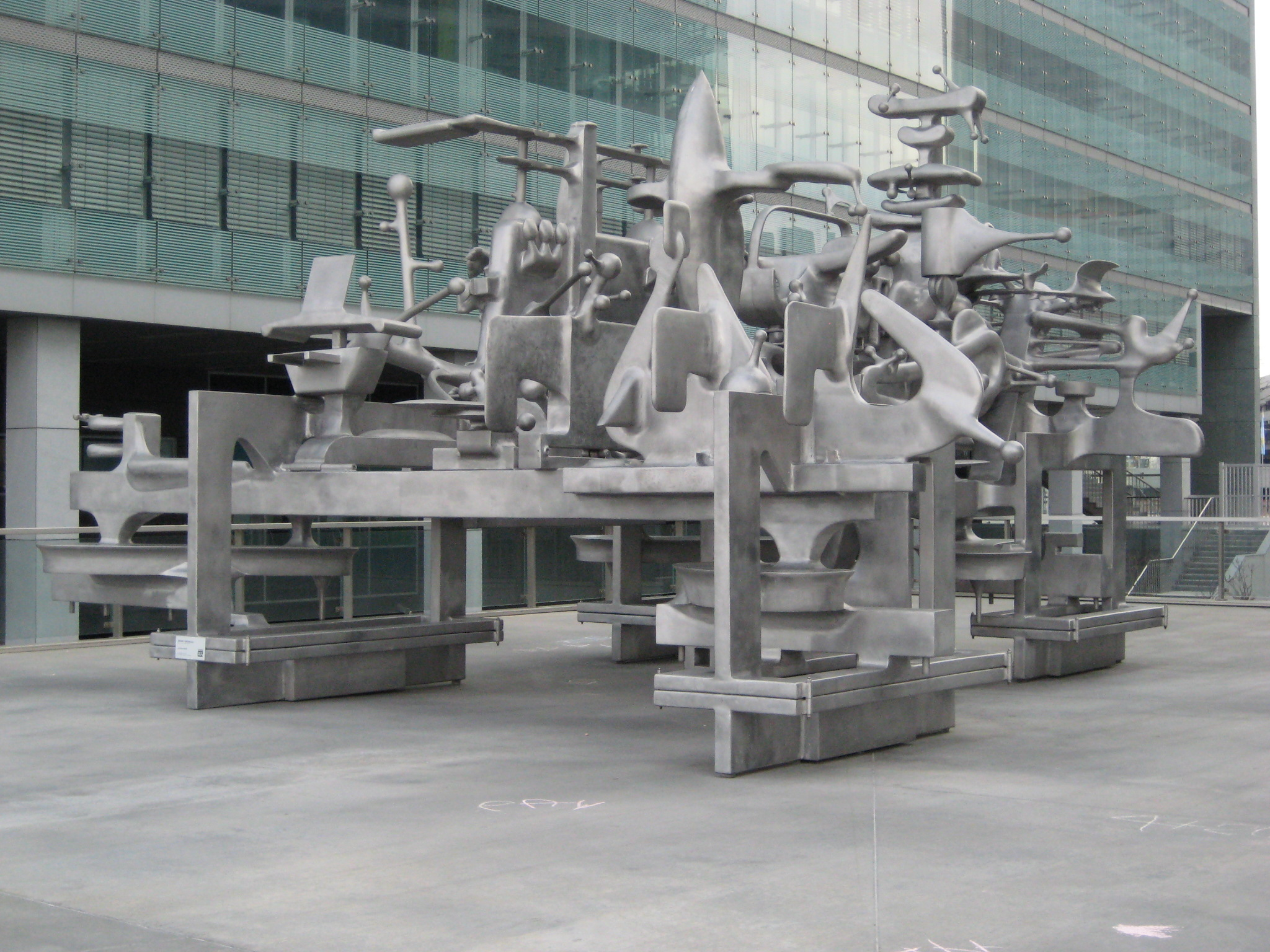
Sculpture by Bruno Gironcoli.

Bruno Gironcoli (27 September 1936 – 19 February 2010) was an Austrian modern artist.

Born in Villach, Gironcoli began training as a goldsmith in 1951 in Innsbruck, completing his apprenticeship in 1956. Between 1957 and 1962, he studied at the University of Applied Arts Vienna. In 1977, Gironcoli became head of the School of Sculpture at the Academy of Fine Arts Vienna, as successor to Fritz Wotruba. He was the official Austrian representative at the 2003 Venice Biennale.

The most substantial collection of his work so far can be seen since September 2004 in a dedicated museum in the Park at Schloss Herberstein. In an area of 2000 square metres, many of his large futuristic sculptures are exhibited.

Bruno Gironcoli died in February 2010 in Vienna after a long illness. He was interred at Wiener Zentralfriedhof.

The Bruno Gironcoli Estate was founded in 2014, by his wife and fellow artist Christine Gironcoli, with headquarters in Vienna.

== Honours and awards ==
- Prize of the city of Vienna for Visual Arts (1976)
- Grand Austrian State Prize (1993)
- Austrian Decoration for Science and Art (1997)
