= Rabenwald =

- Former municipality
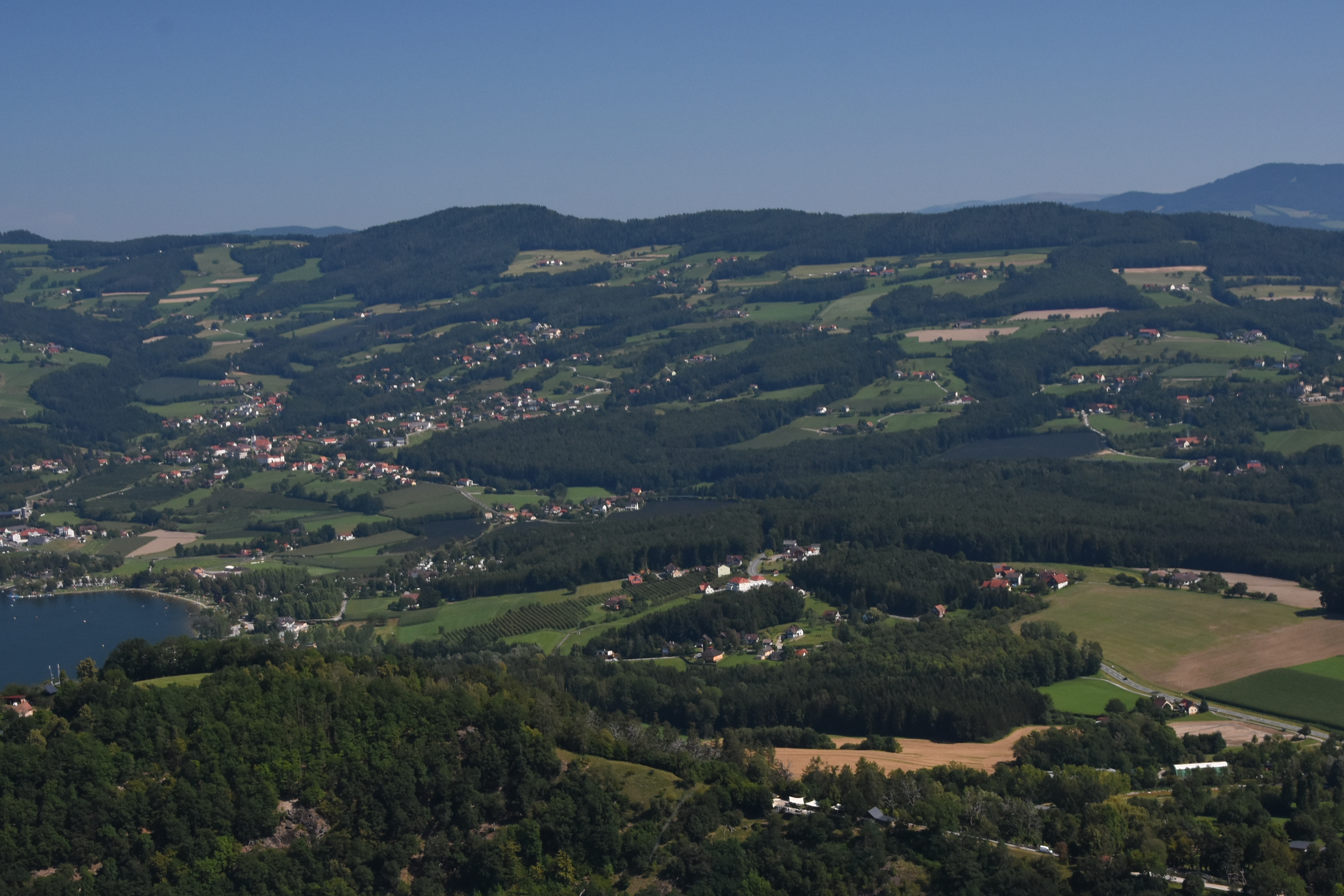
- Aerial view with Rabenwald in the background

- Coat of arms

- Location within Austria
- Coordinates: 47°18′10″N 15°47′51″E
- Country: Austria
- State: Styria
- District: Hartberg-Fürstenfeld

Area
  - Total: 16.91 km^{2} (6.53 sq mi)
- Elevation: 520 m (1,710 ft)

Population (1 January 2016)
  - Total: 604
  - Density: 35.7/km^{2} (92.5/sq mi)
- Time zone: UTC+1 (CET)
  - Summer (DST): UTC+2 (CEST)
- Postal code: 8225
- Area code: 03335
- Vehicle registration: HB
- Website: www.rabenwald. steiermark.at

Rabenwald is a former municipality in the district of Hartberg-Fürstenfeld in Styria, Austria. Since the 2015 Styria municipal structural reform, it is part of the municipality Pöllau.
