= Schönegg, Upper Austria =

Schönegg
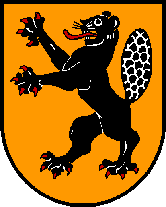
- Coat of arms

- Location within Austria
- Coordinates: 48°34′16″N 14°10′22″E
- Country: Austria
- State: Upper Austria
- District: Rohrbach

Area
  - Total: 10 km^{2} (3.9 sq mi)
- Elevation: 852 m (2,795 ft)

Population (14 June 2016)
  - Total: 546
  - Density: 55/km^{2} (140/sq mi)
- Time zone: UTC+1 (CET)
  - Summer (DST): UTC+2 (CEST)
- Postal code: 4184
- Area code: 07216
- Vehicle registration: RO
- Website: www.schoenegg.ooe.gv.at

Schönegg was a municipality in the district of Rohrbach in the Austrian state of Upper Austria.

== Population ==
Historical population
Year	Pop.	±%
1869	948	—
1880	898	−5.3%
1890	815	−9.2%
1900	709	−13.0%
1910	690	−2.7%
1923	691	+0.1%
1934	752	+8.8%
1939	703	−6.5%
1951	621	−11.7%
1961	590	−5.0%
1971	596	+1.0%
1981	516	−13.4%
1991	557	+7.9%
2001	554	−0.5%
2011	536	−3.2%
