= Schloss Herberstein =

Castle in Austria

Coordinates: 47°13′09″N 15°48′45″E

- Sankt Johann bei Herberstein, Austria
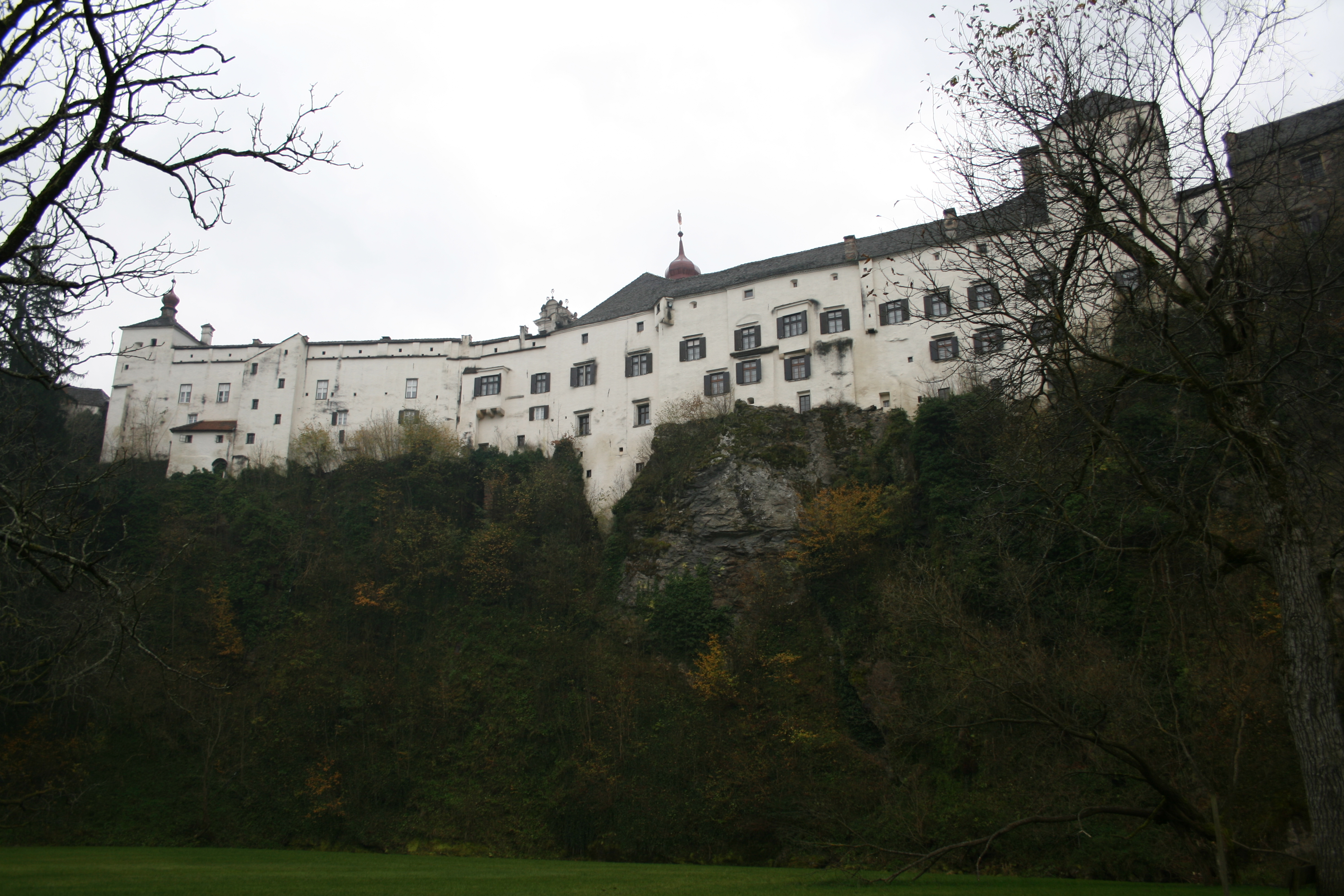

Site information
- Type: Castle

Schloss Herberstein is a castle in Styria, Austria. Schloss Herberstein is situated at an elevation of 450 m (1,480 ft).

== Castle and the surrounding area ==
Herberstein Castle sits on a rock in the Feistritz ravine and thus is not accessible from 3 sides. At the same time, the castle is not visible from out of the ravine and was thus naturally protected from attackers.

The oldest parts of the caste situated near the zoo stems from the 12th century. The first small castle called 'Herwigstein' (named after Herwig of Krottendorf) stood under the fiefdom of the Stubenberg Clan. Otto von Hartenberg could free the castle by a payment to the Stubenbergs and is considered to be the ancestor of Herberstein Castle since then.

By 1400 the castle was expanded by a massive outer bailey, which included the previously built Gothic chapel of St. Catherine. The bailey was extended in the 15th century a number times. Mid-16th century, the castle was transformed into a residential building with Renaissance elements and expanded to accommodate the numerous offspring. In the 17th century the magnificent banqueting hall was built, the deep moat was built on. Mid-17th century the 'Florentinerhof' was constructed after an Italian model and by the end of the century St. George's Chapel, the gardeners home and the 'Maierhof' were completed.

In the 17th and 18th century about one-fifth of Styria was possessed by Counts of Herberstein. Some 1,000 farms were tributary to the castle. The castle is still owned by the Herberstein family and serves as a residential and administrative center.

Admission to the castle includes guided tours of part of the castle, access to the historic gardens, the zoo, and the Gironcoli Museum, which features works by contemporary Austrian artist Bruno Gironcoli.

== Zoo ==
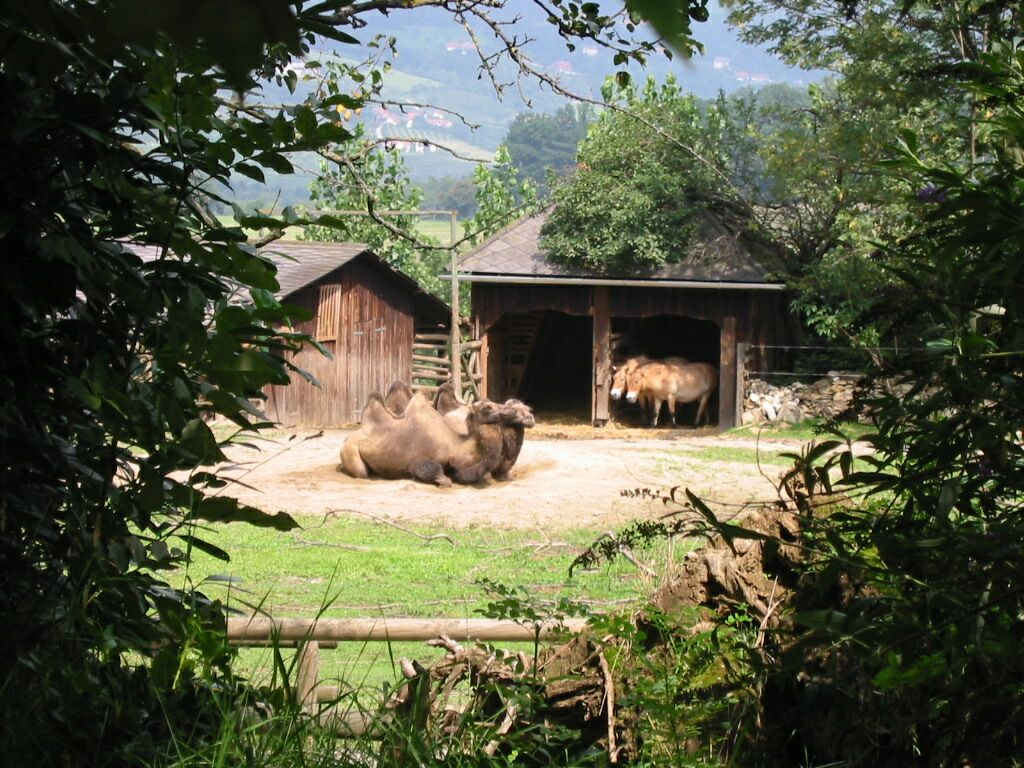
Wild animals in the Herberstein Zoo.

The keeping of wild animals has a long tradition in Herberstein. It can be tracked back to the 17th century, the first time fallow deer were kept in Austria. At the end of 1960 Herberstein was converted into a zoo where visitors could see animals from all five continents. At that time the castle was opened to the public for the first time, too. Today the Herberstein Zoo is very well designed and has the largest cheetah park in Europe. It includes a remodeled ski-lift, forcing the cheetah to catch their food, which is hauled by the ski-lift at fast pace.

== Public Administration ==
After the conviction of Andrea Herberstein (born Untersteiner) for serious commercial fraud in connection with the misuse of state subsidies granted to the Herberstein Zoo, the zoo's management changed to the Styrian Tiergarten GmbH, which is owned by Styria.

== See also ==
- Herberstein family
- List of castles in Austria

== Gallery ==
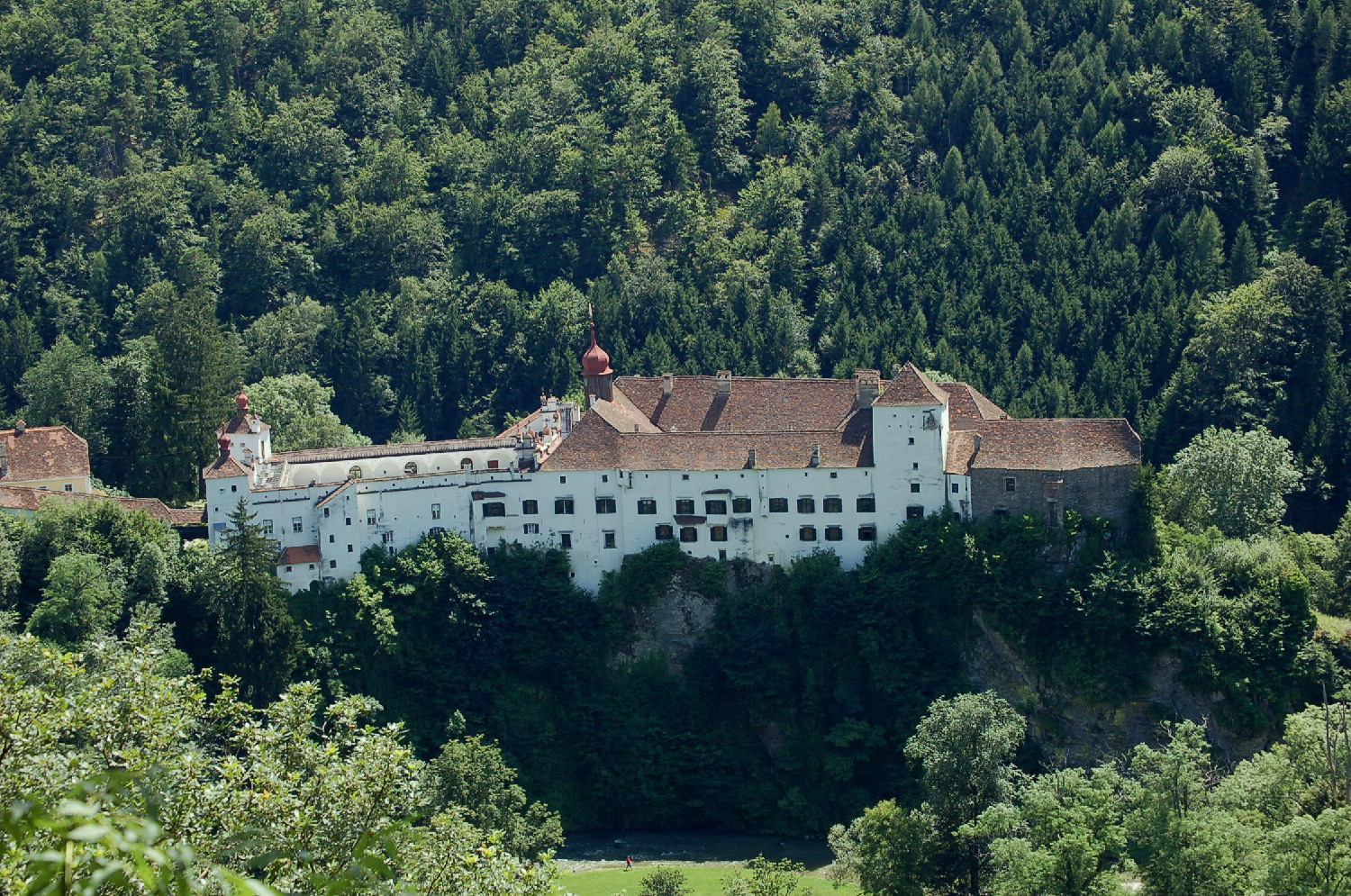
Castle Herberstein (July 2006)

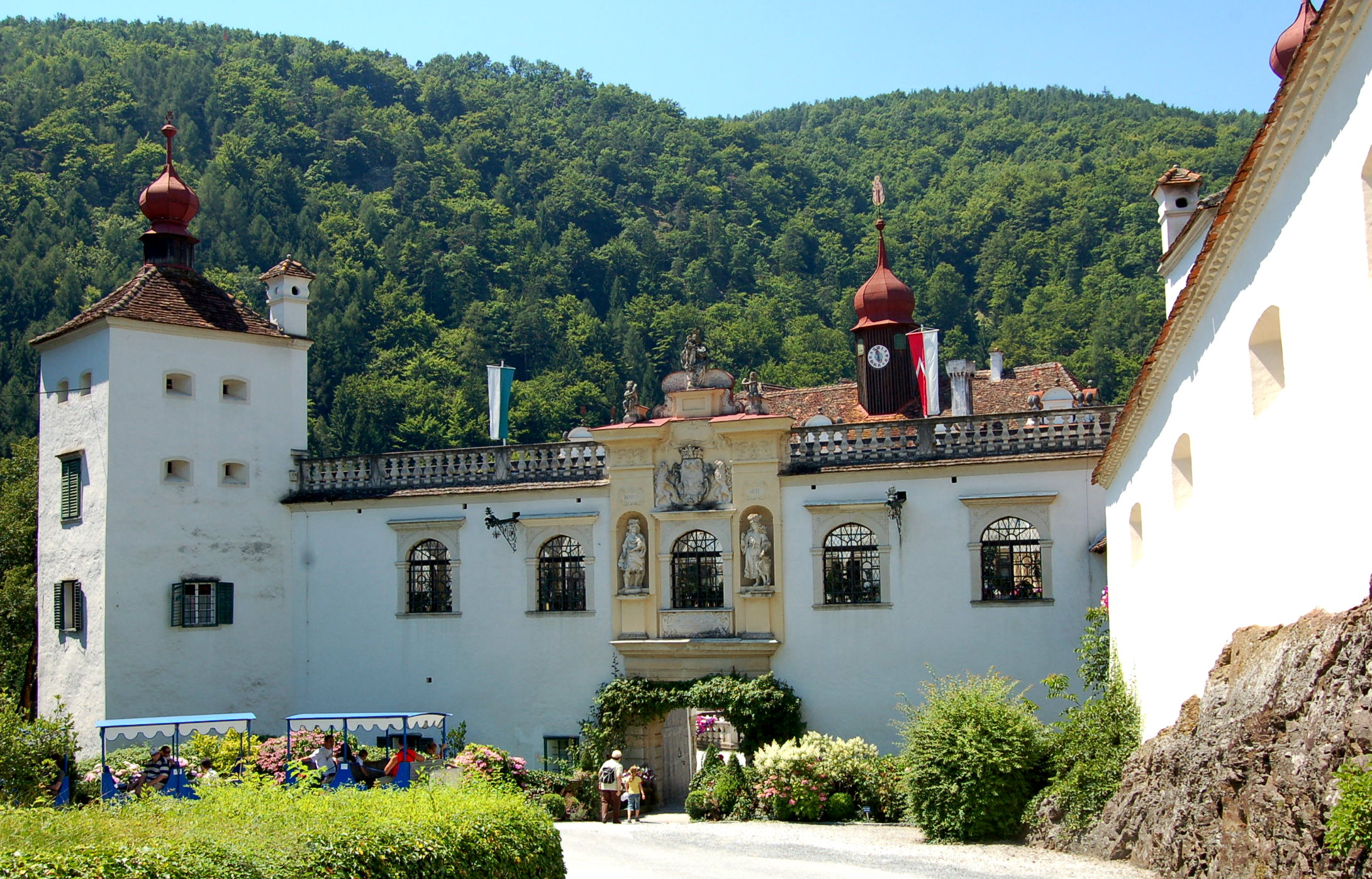
Entrance to the Castle

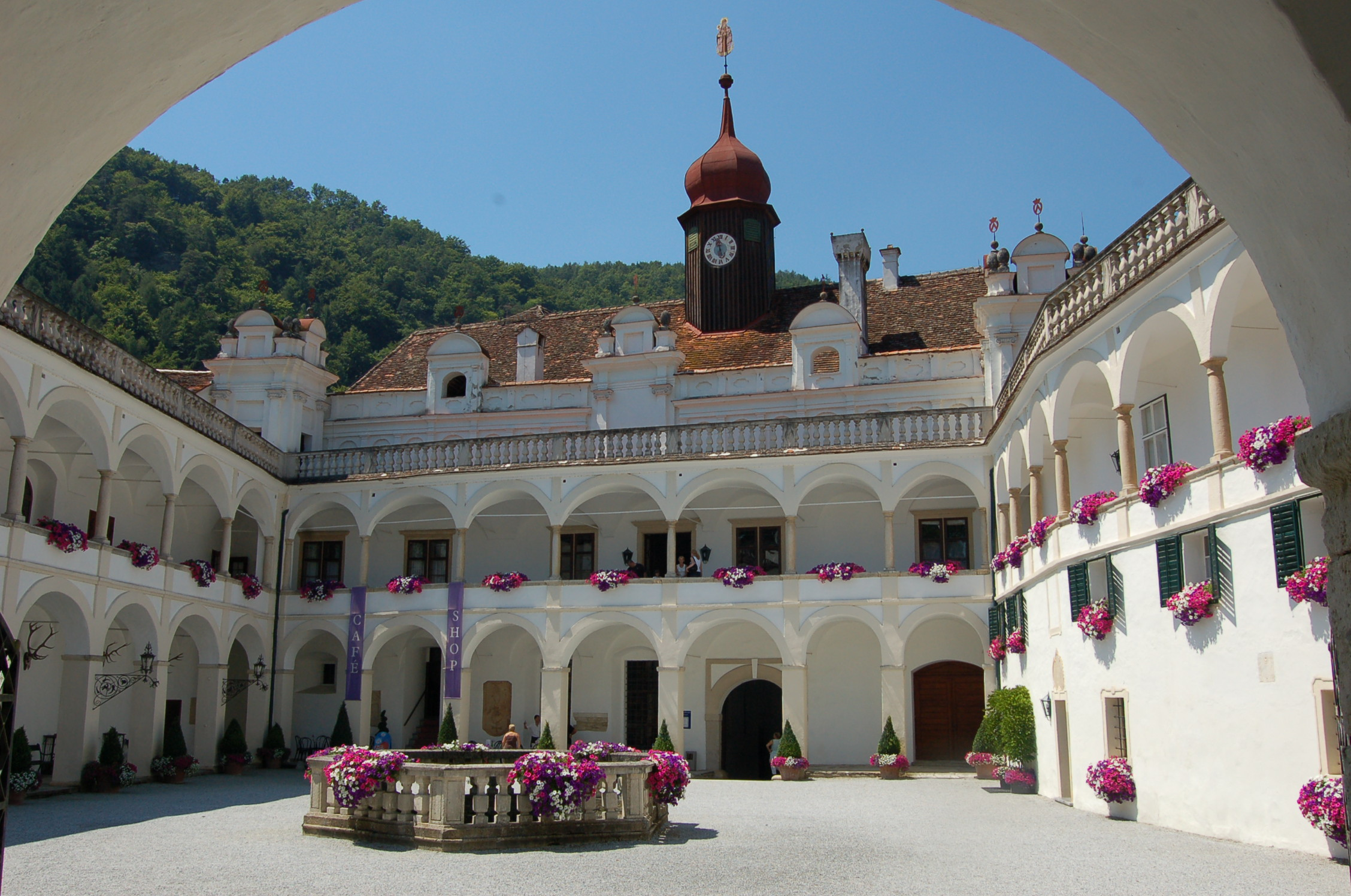
Castle Courtyard, seen from the entrance

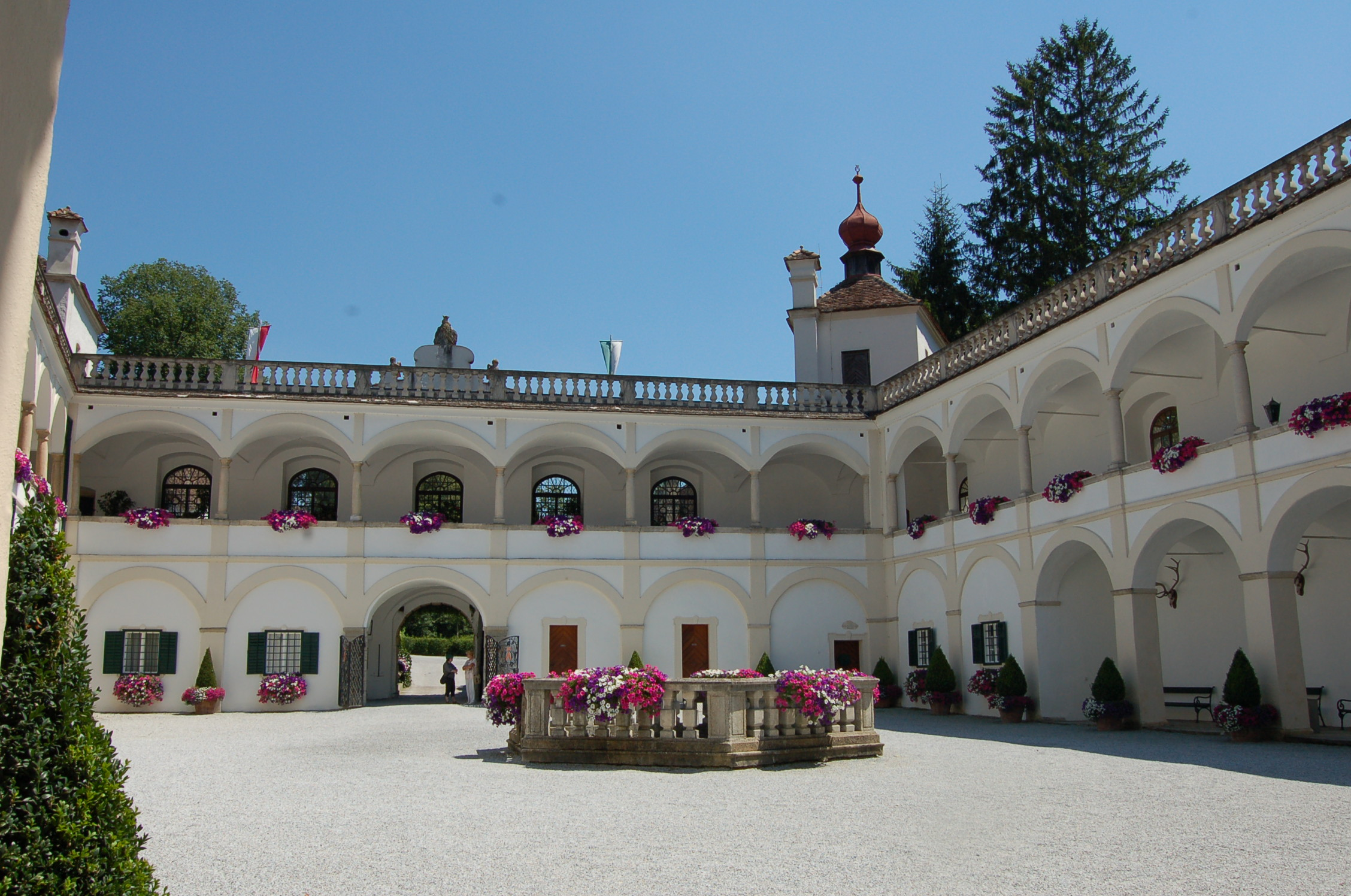
Castle Courtyard, seen from the entrance

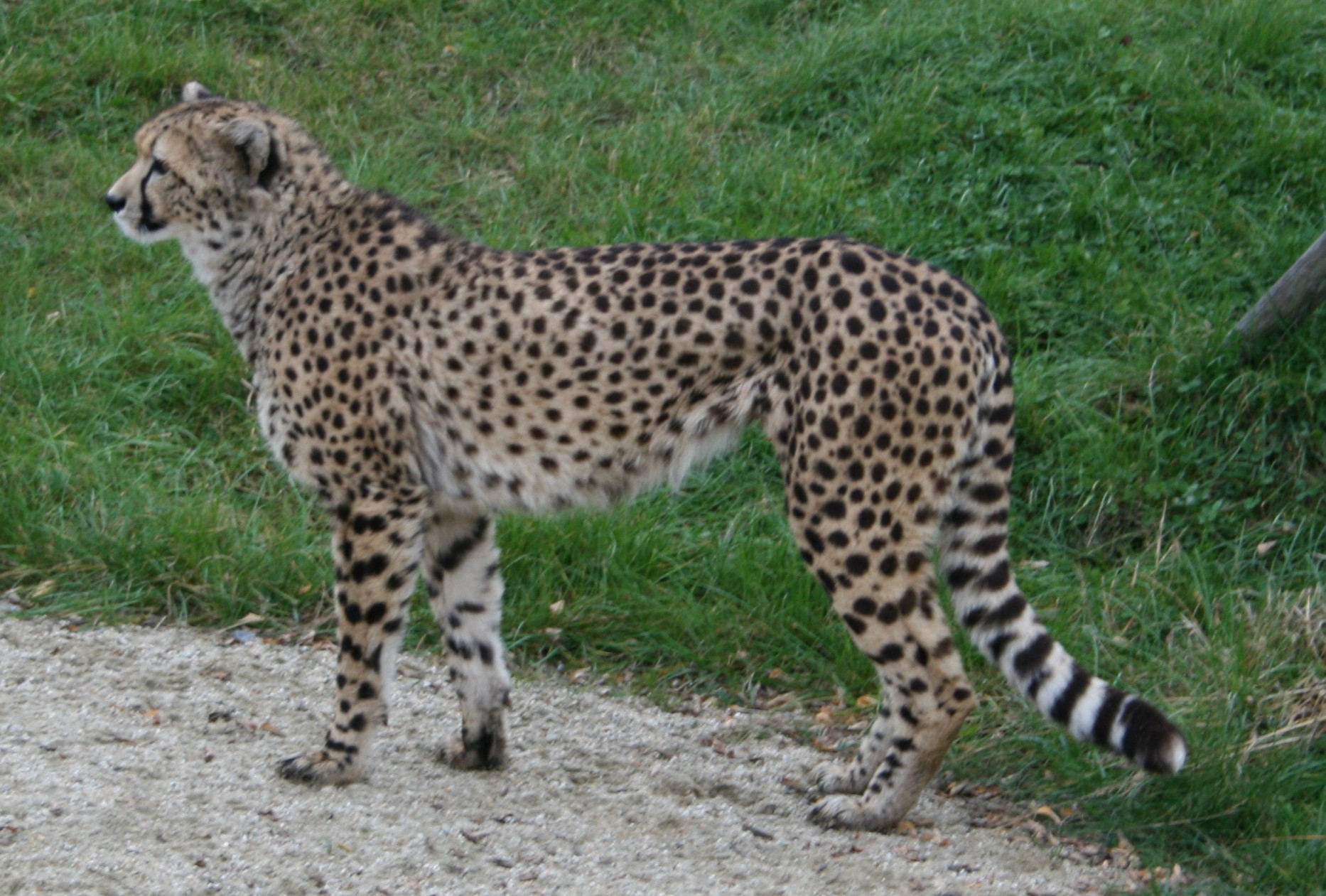
Cheetah within the zoo (November 2006)

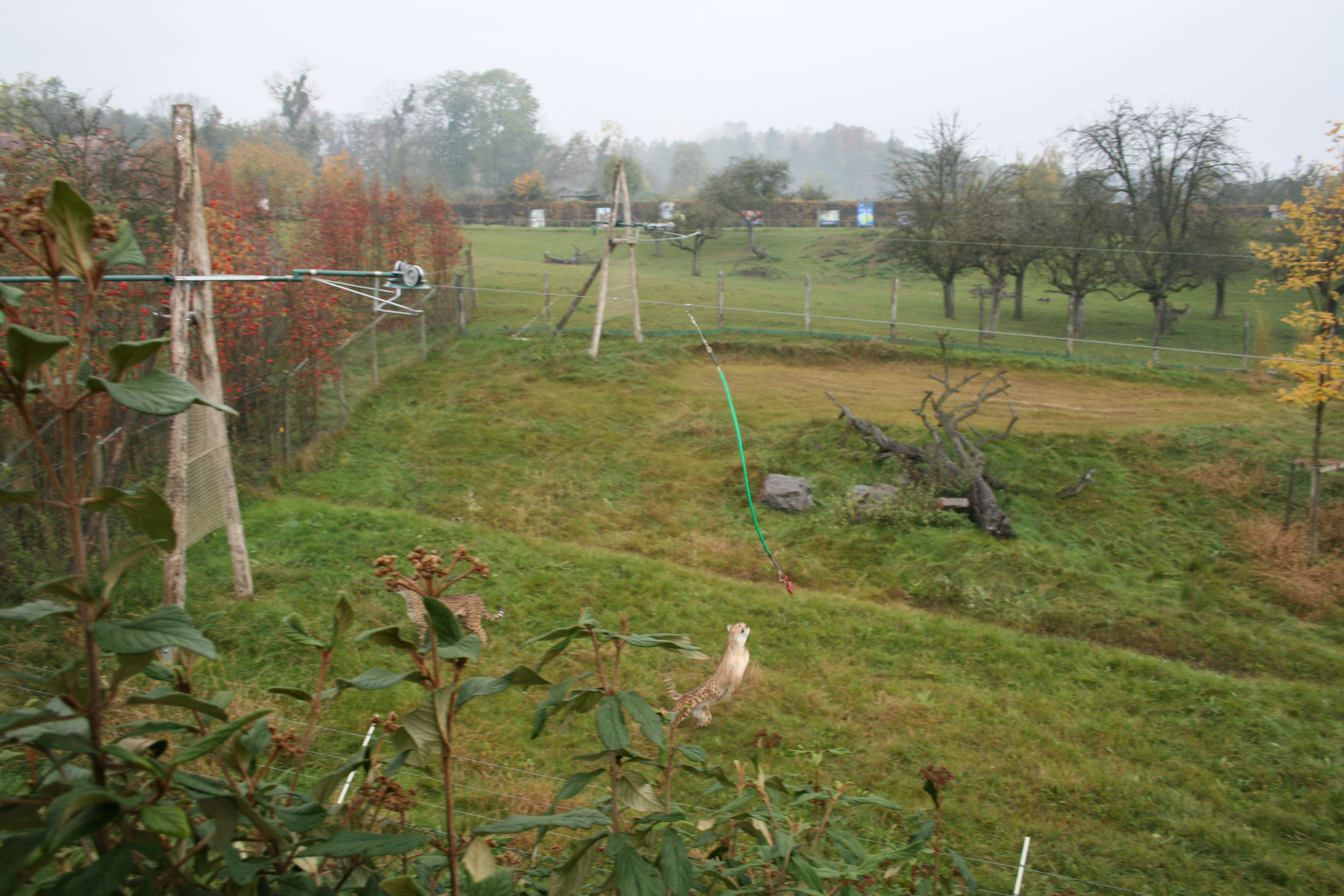
Cheetah fed by re-modeled ski-lift, picture 1 of 3 (November 2006)

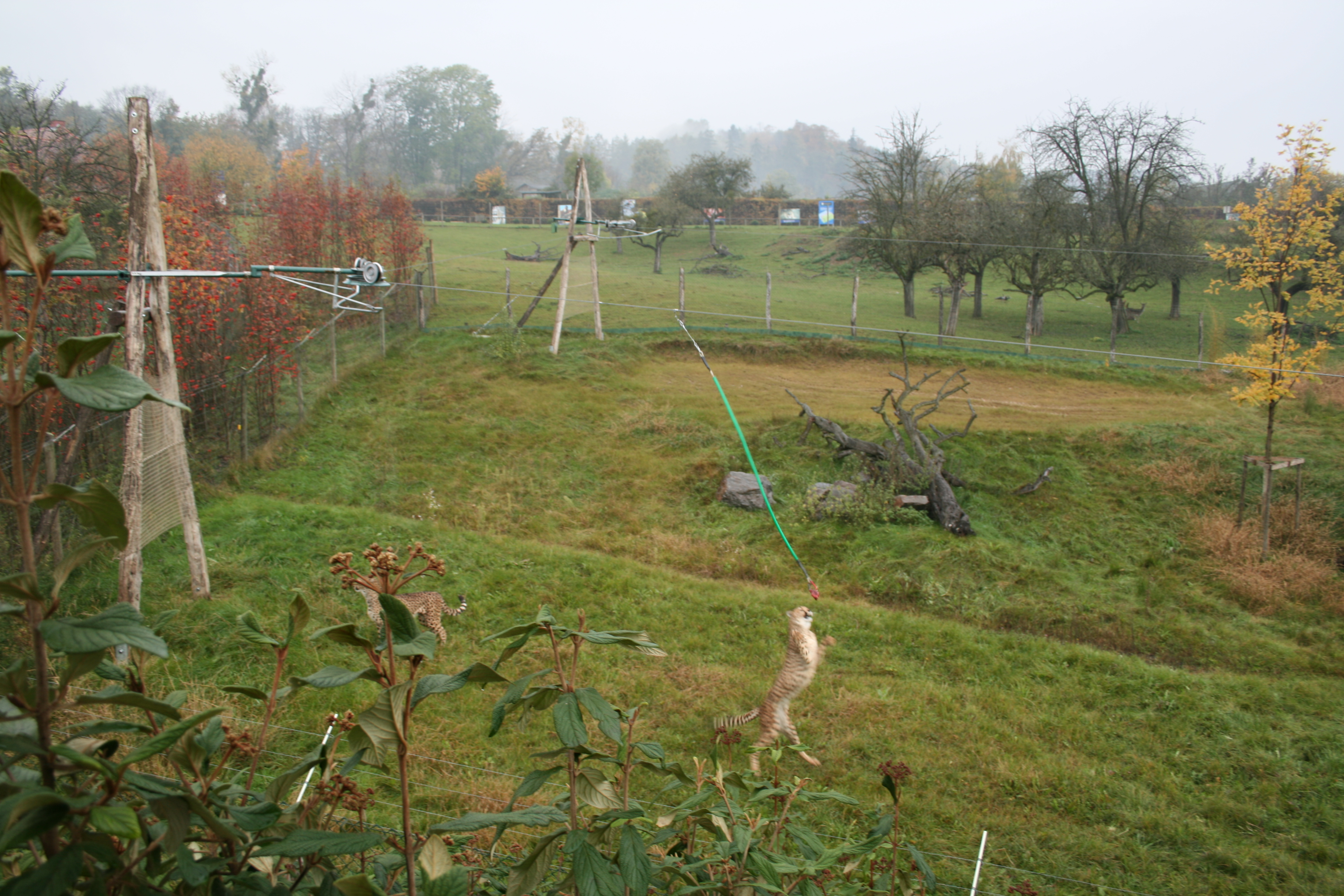
Cheetah fed by re-modeled ski-lift, picture 2 of 3(November 2006)

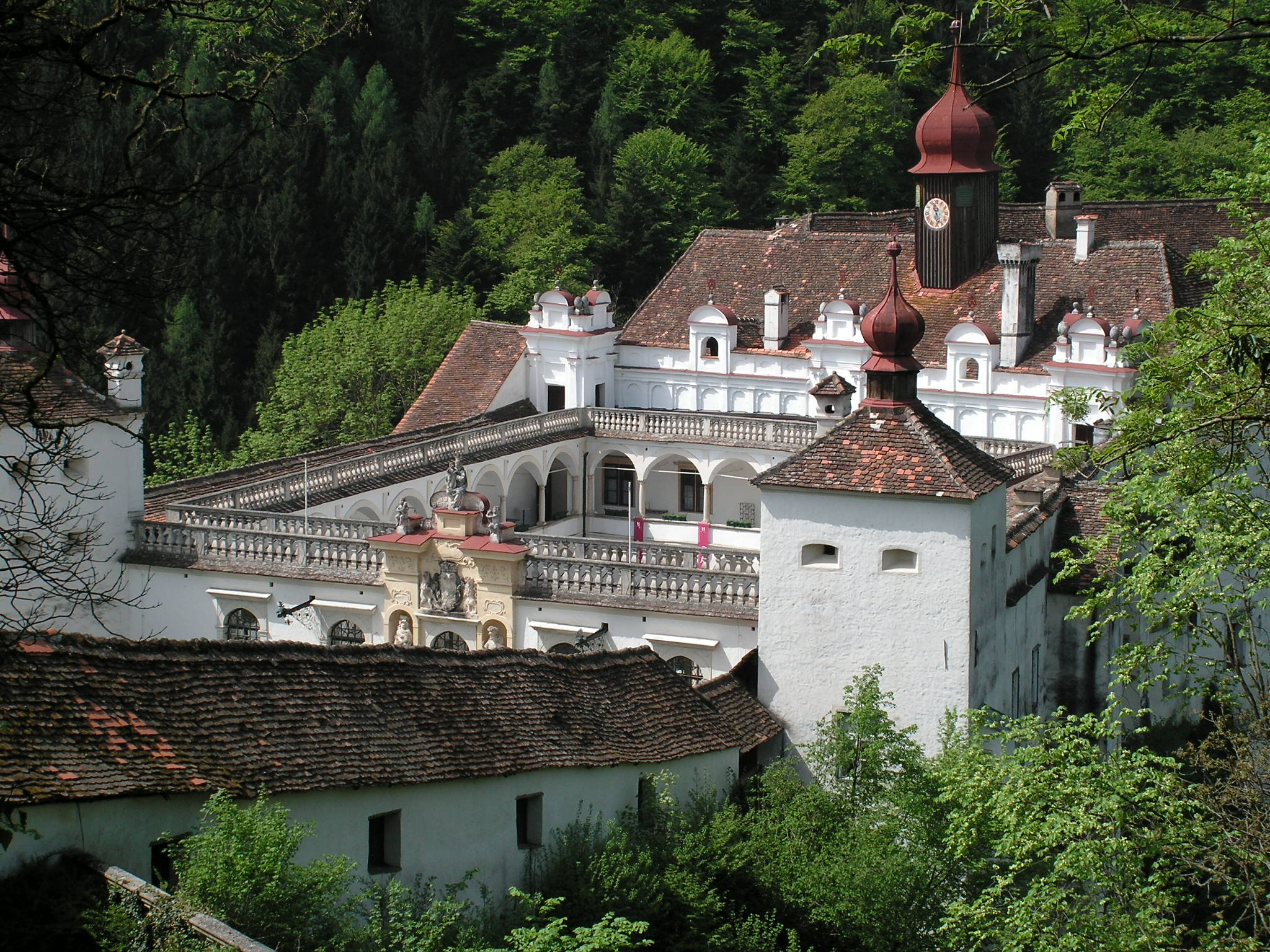
Castle Herberstein

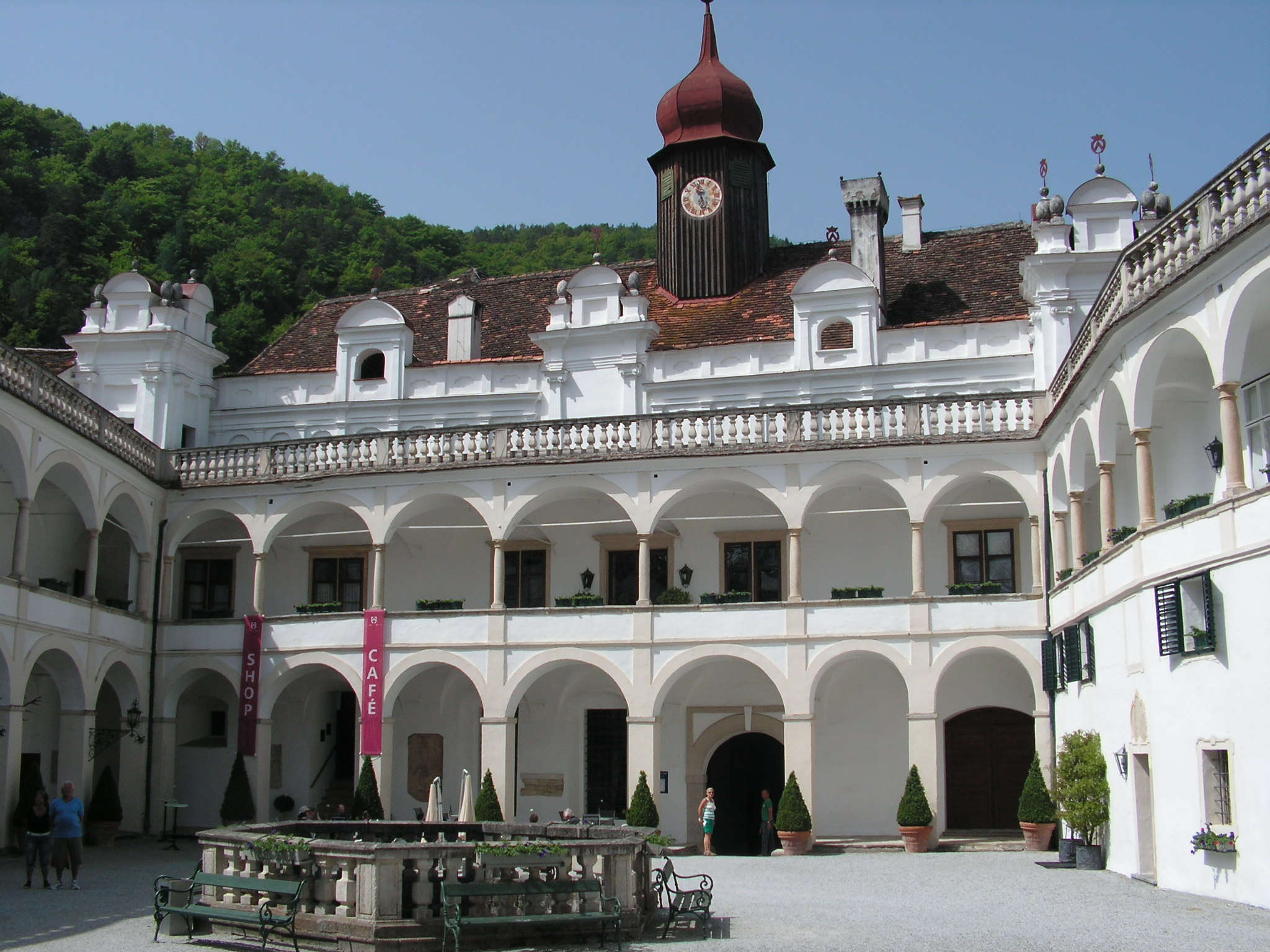
Castle Herberstein

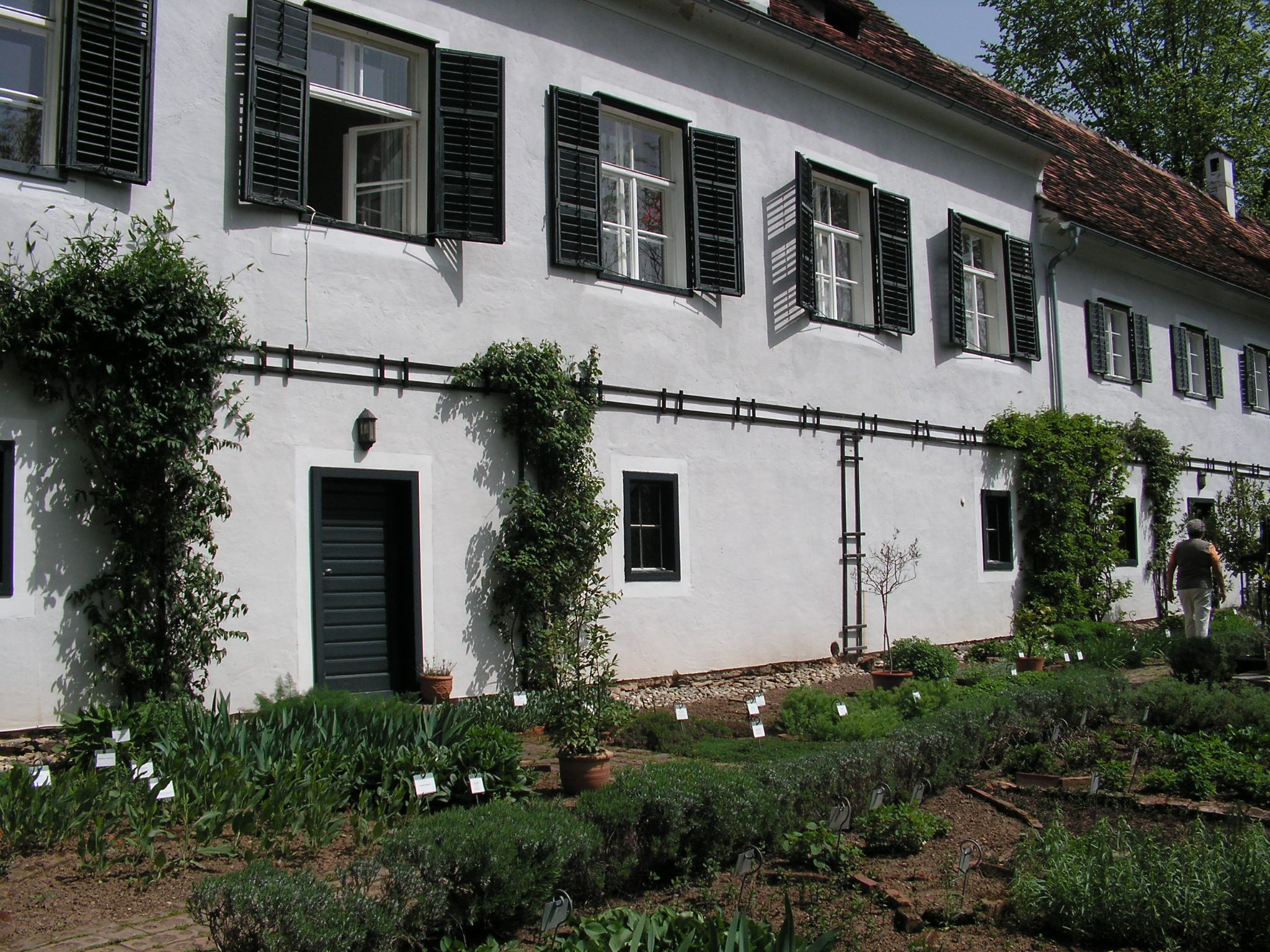
Castle Herberstein

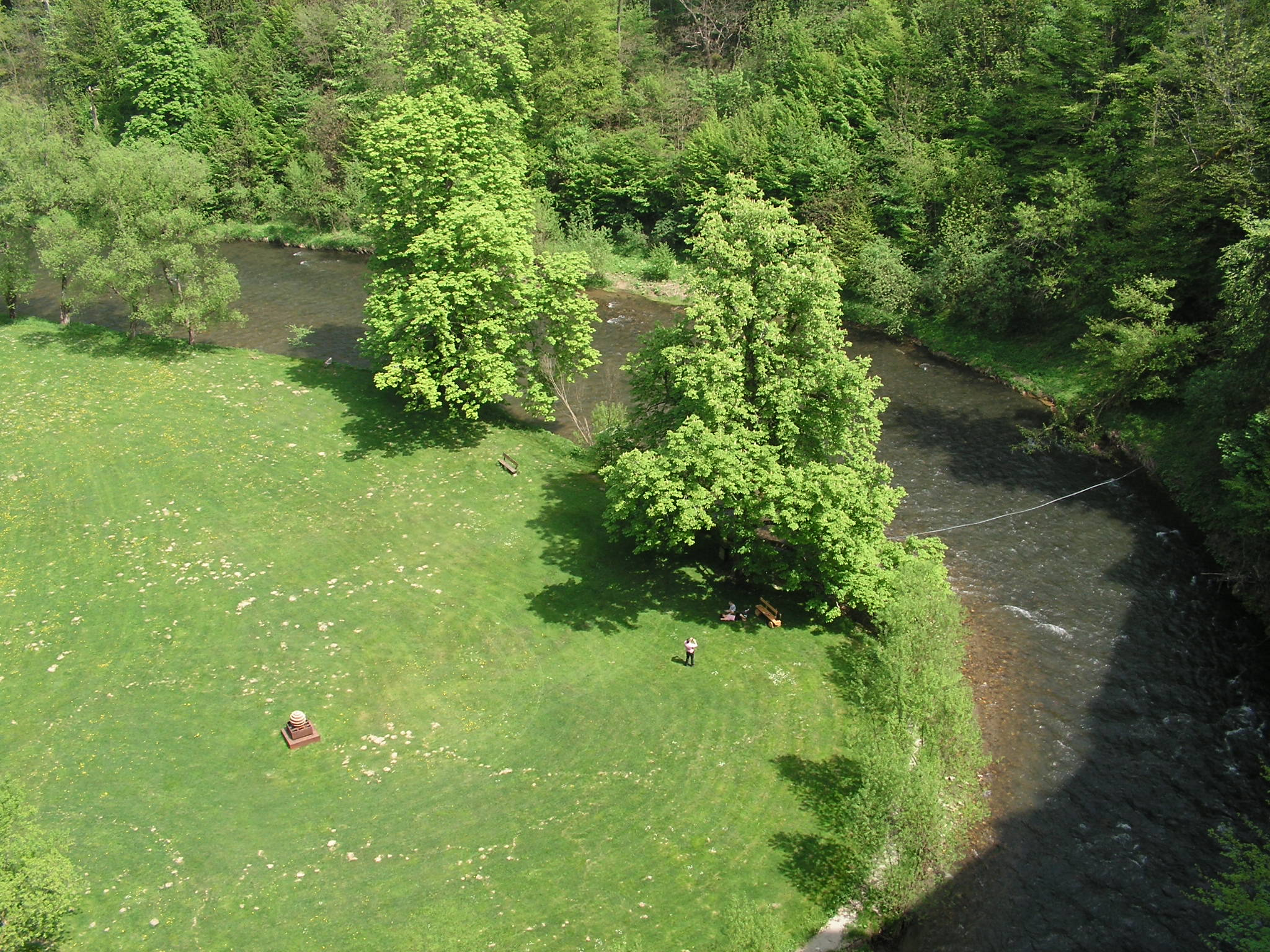
Feistritz gorge

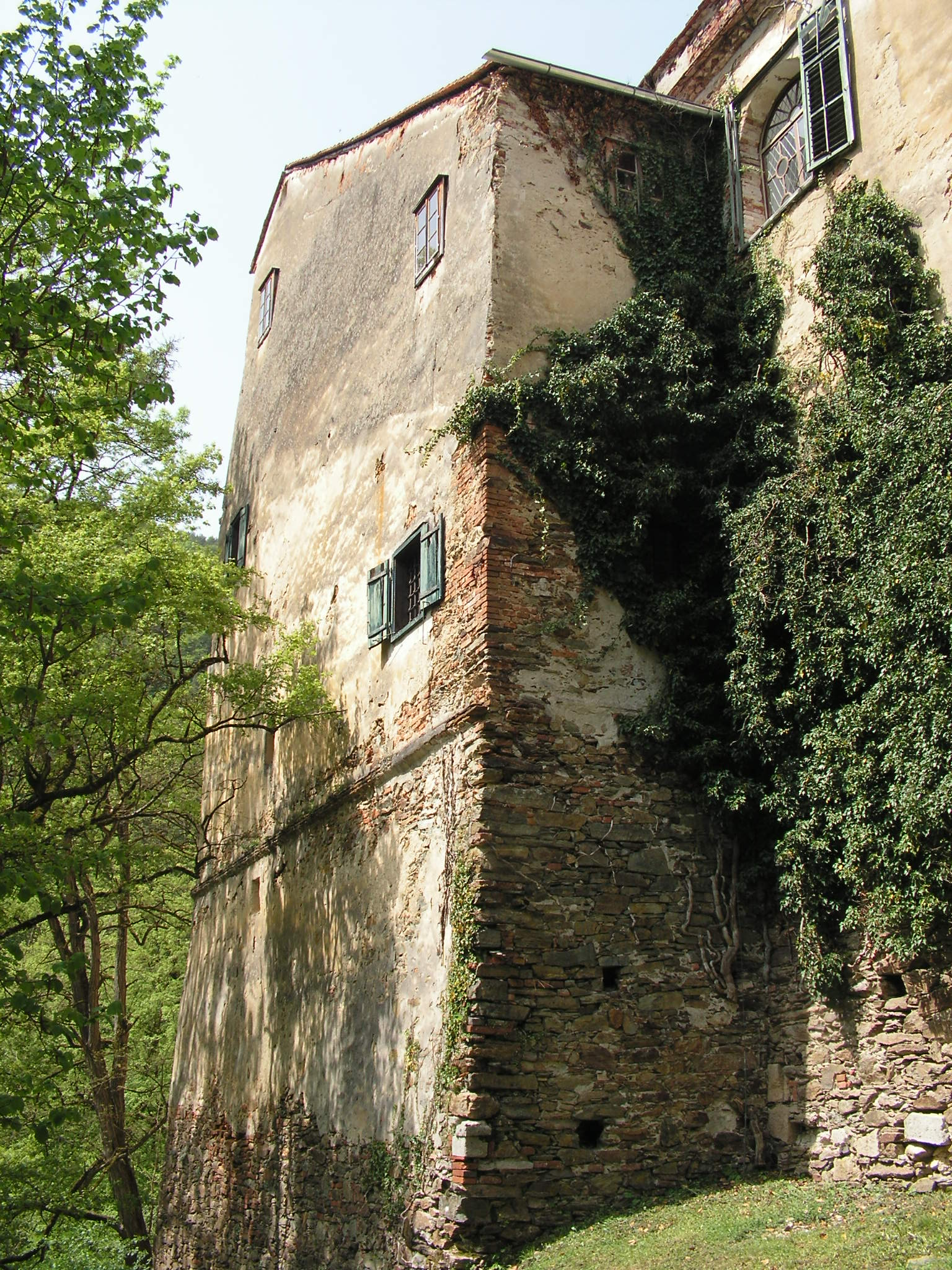
Castle Herberstein

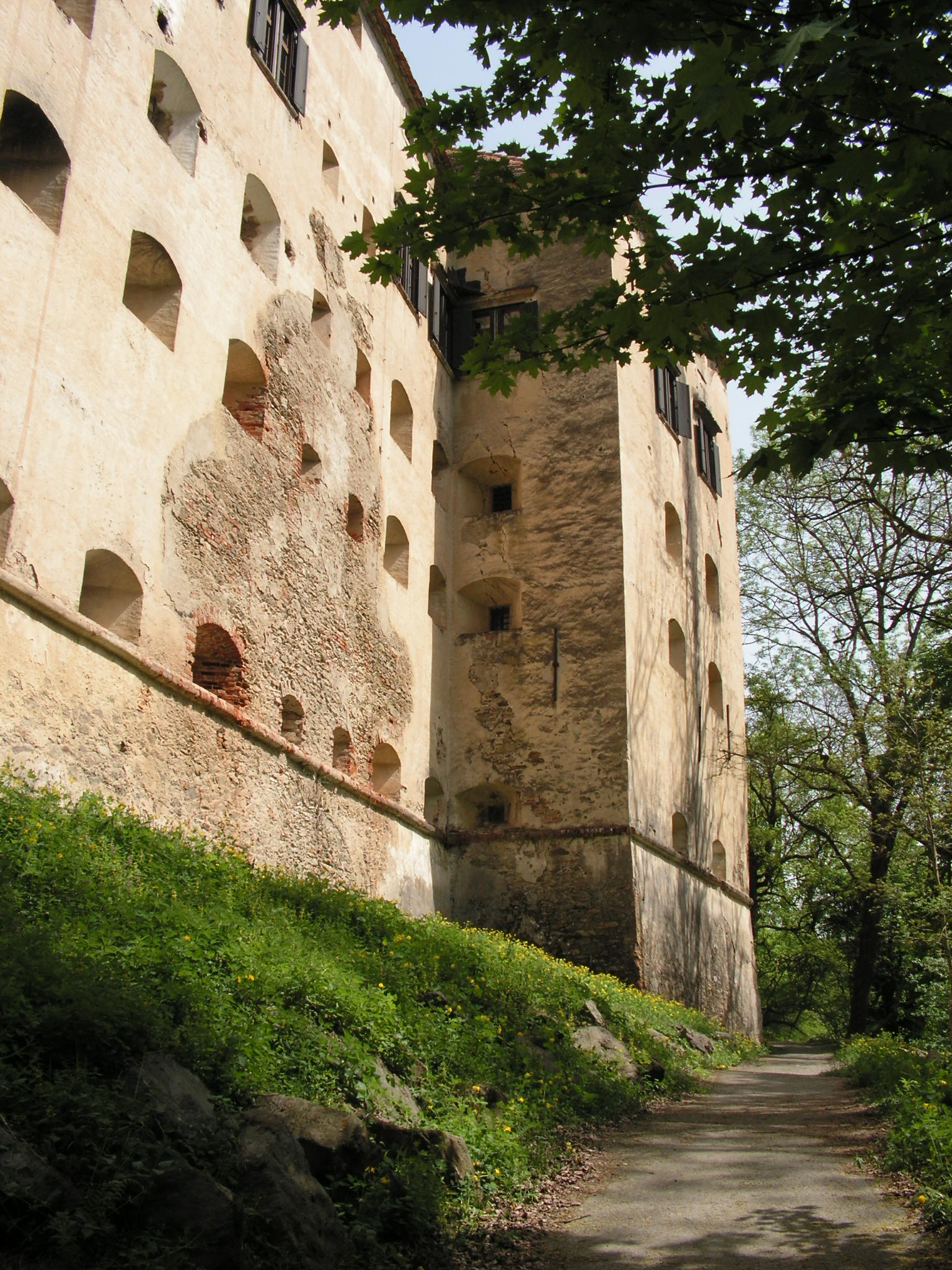
Castle Herberstein

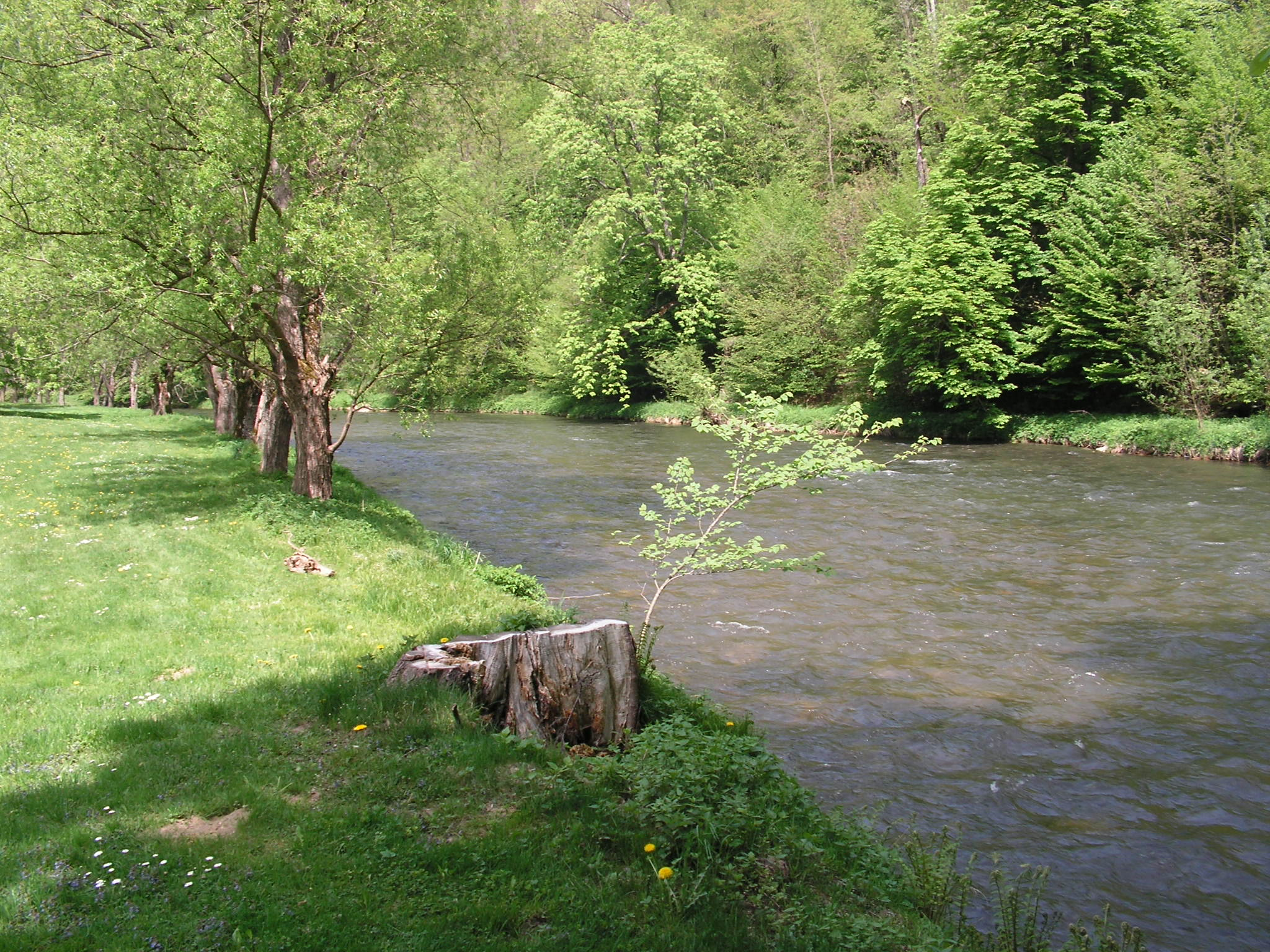
Feistritz gorge

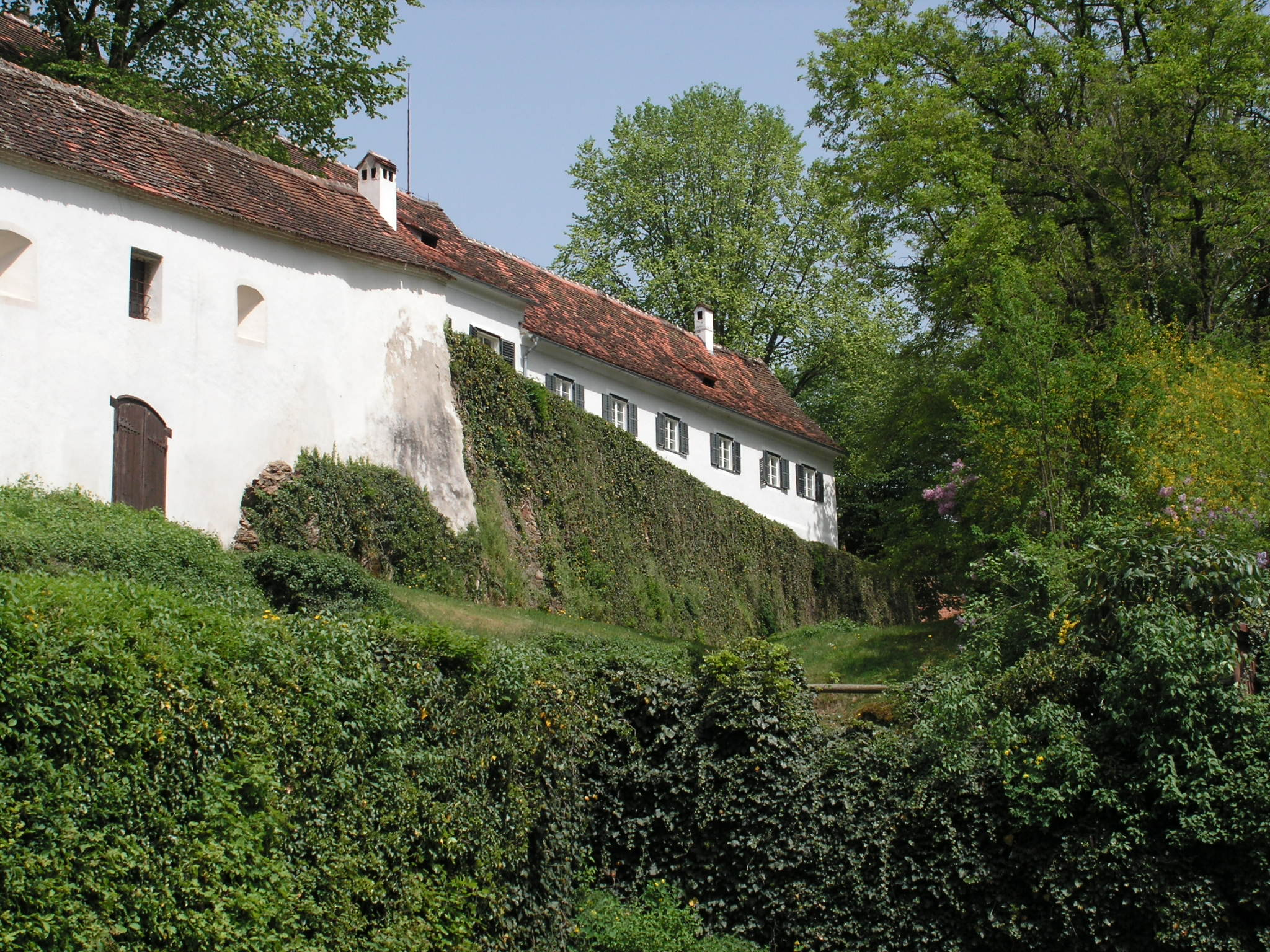
Castle Herberstein

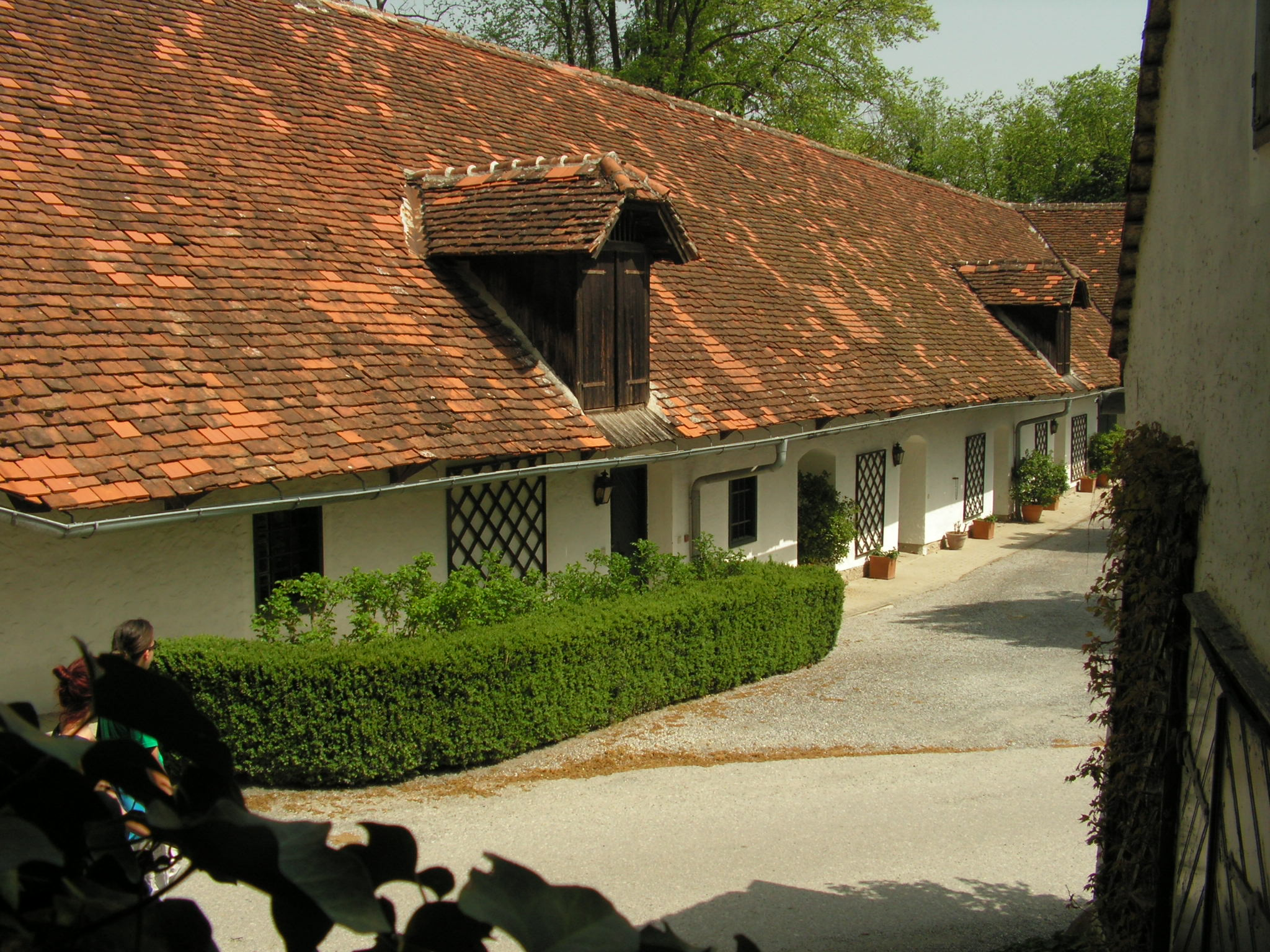
Castle Herberstein, Outbuildings

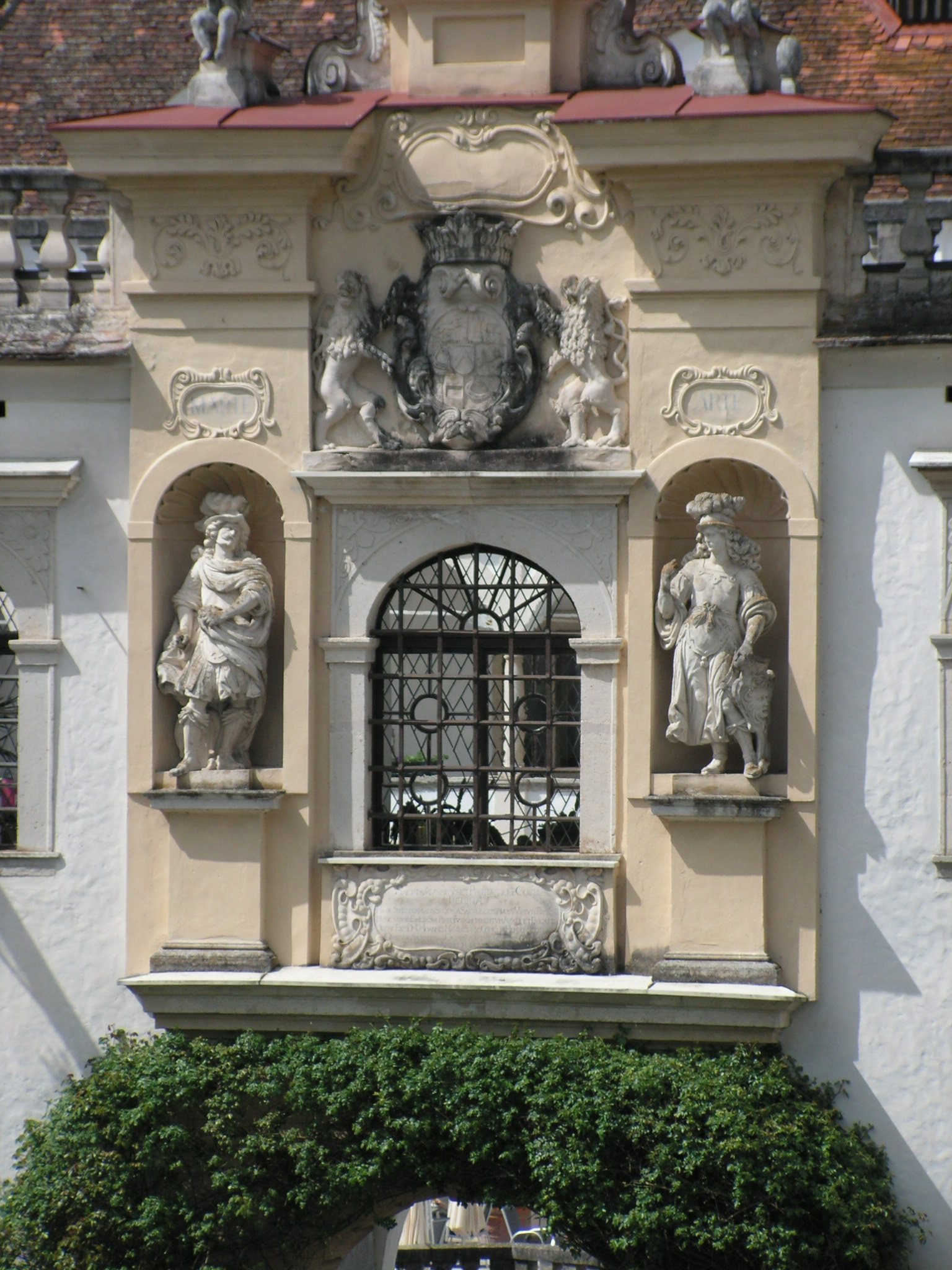
Castle Herberstein

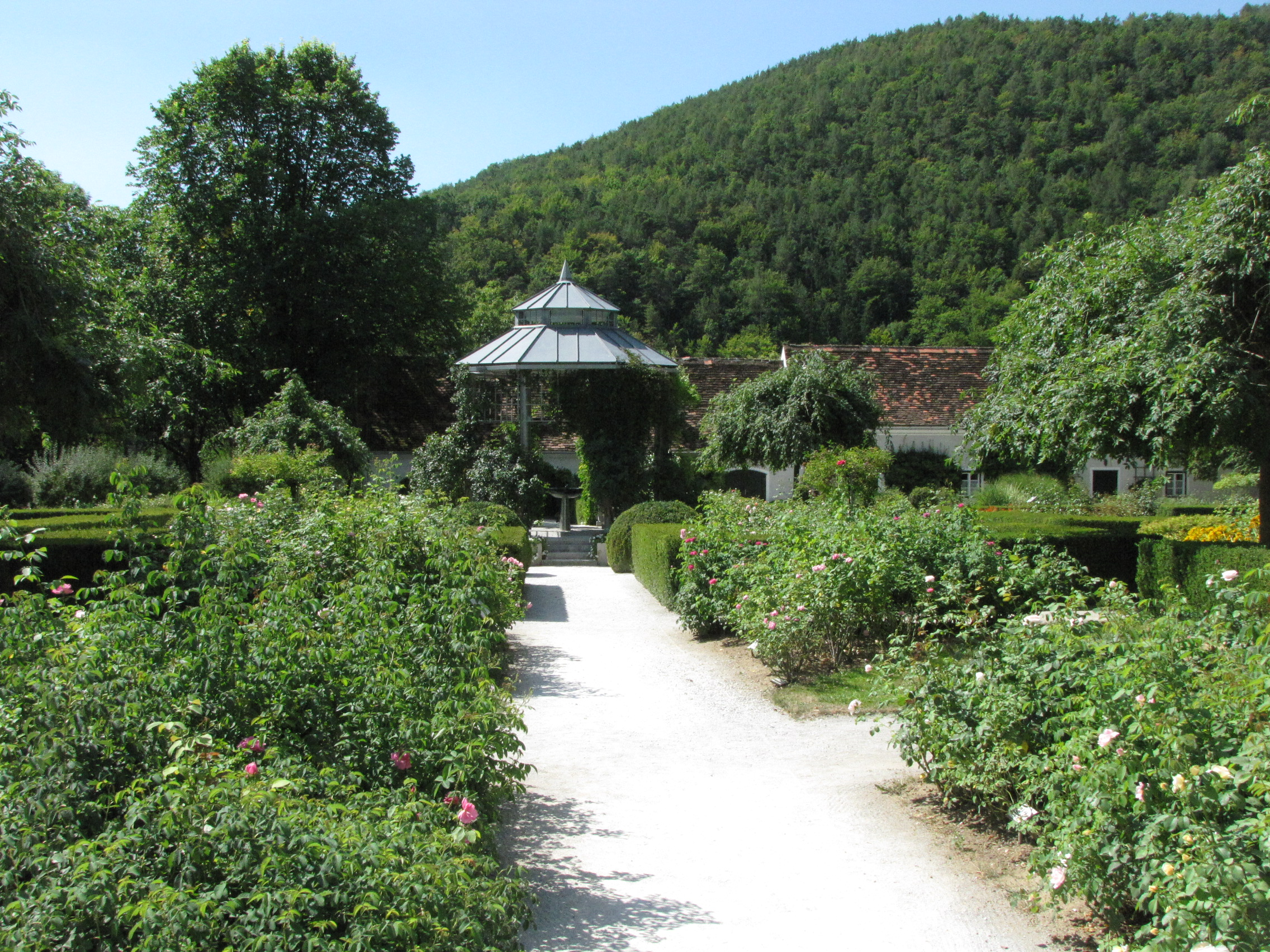
Castle garden

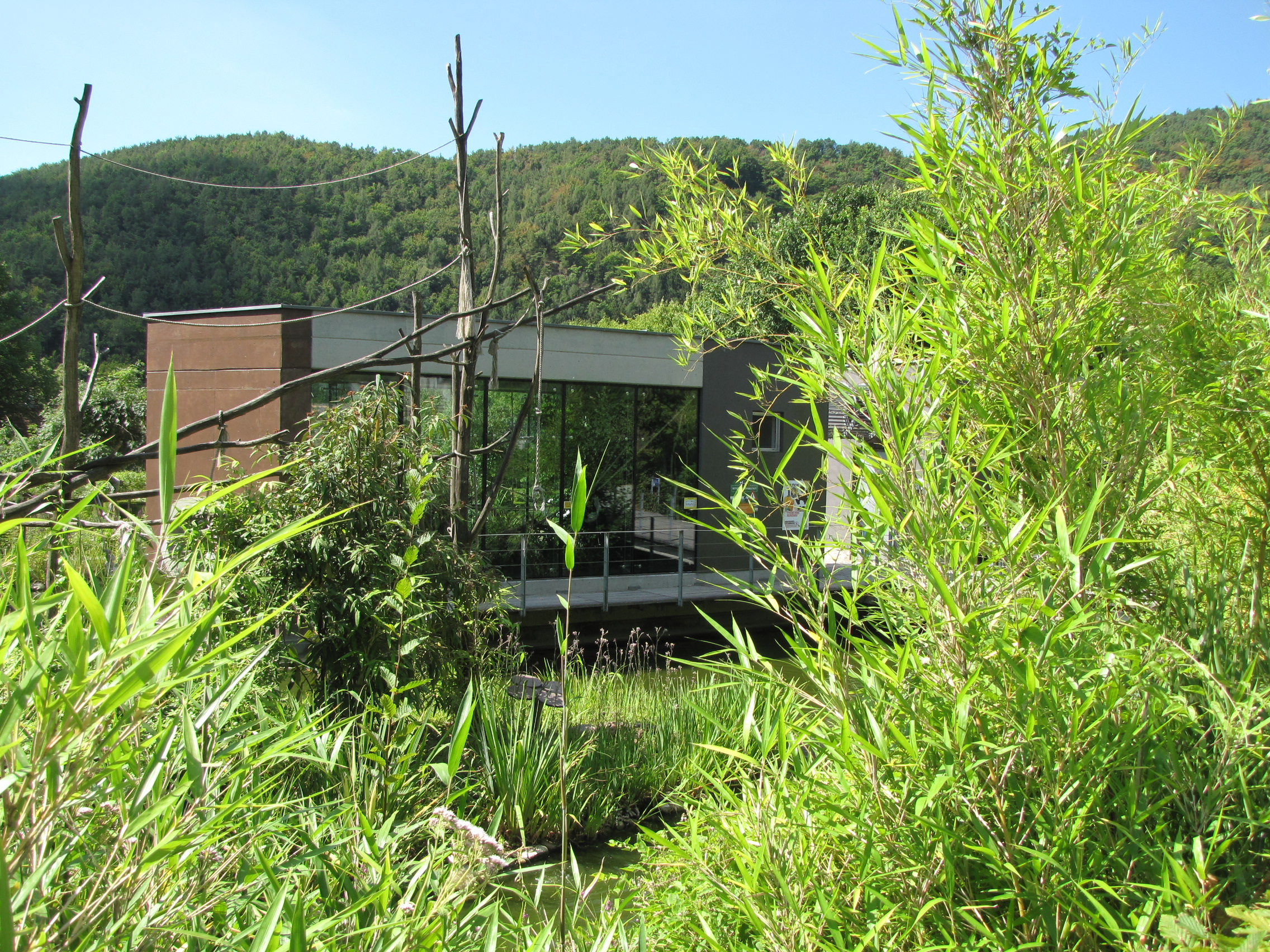
Castle garden

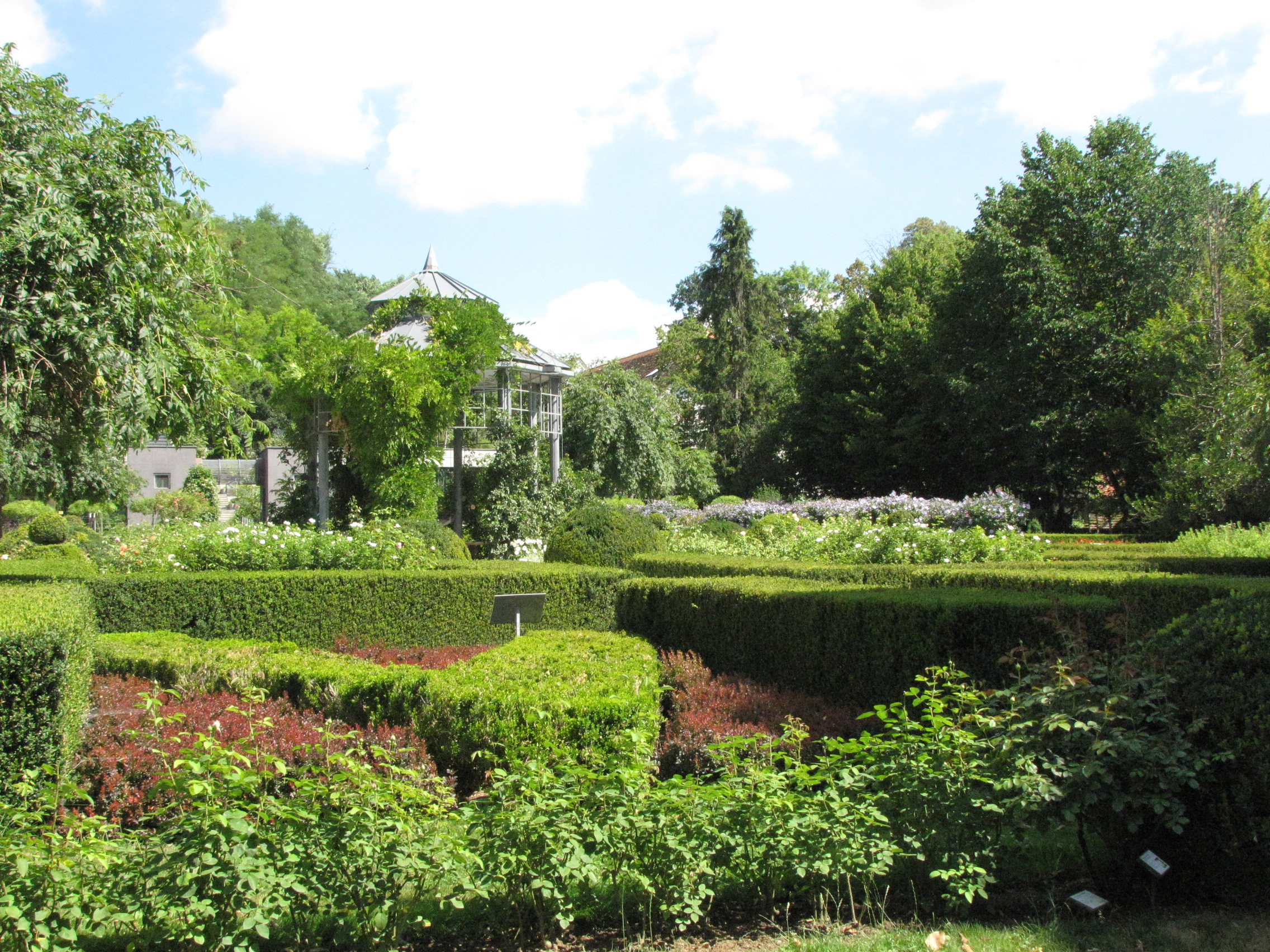
Castle garden

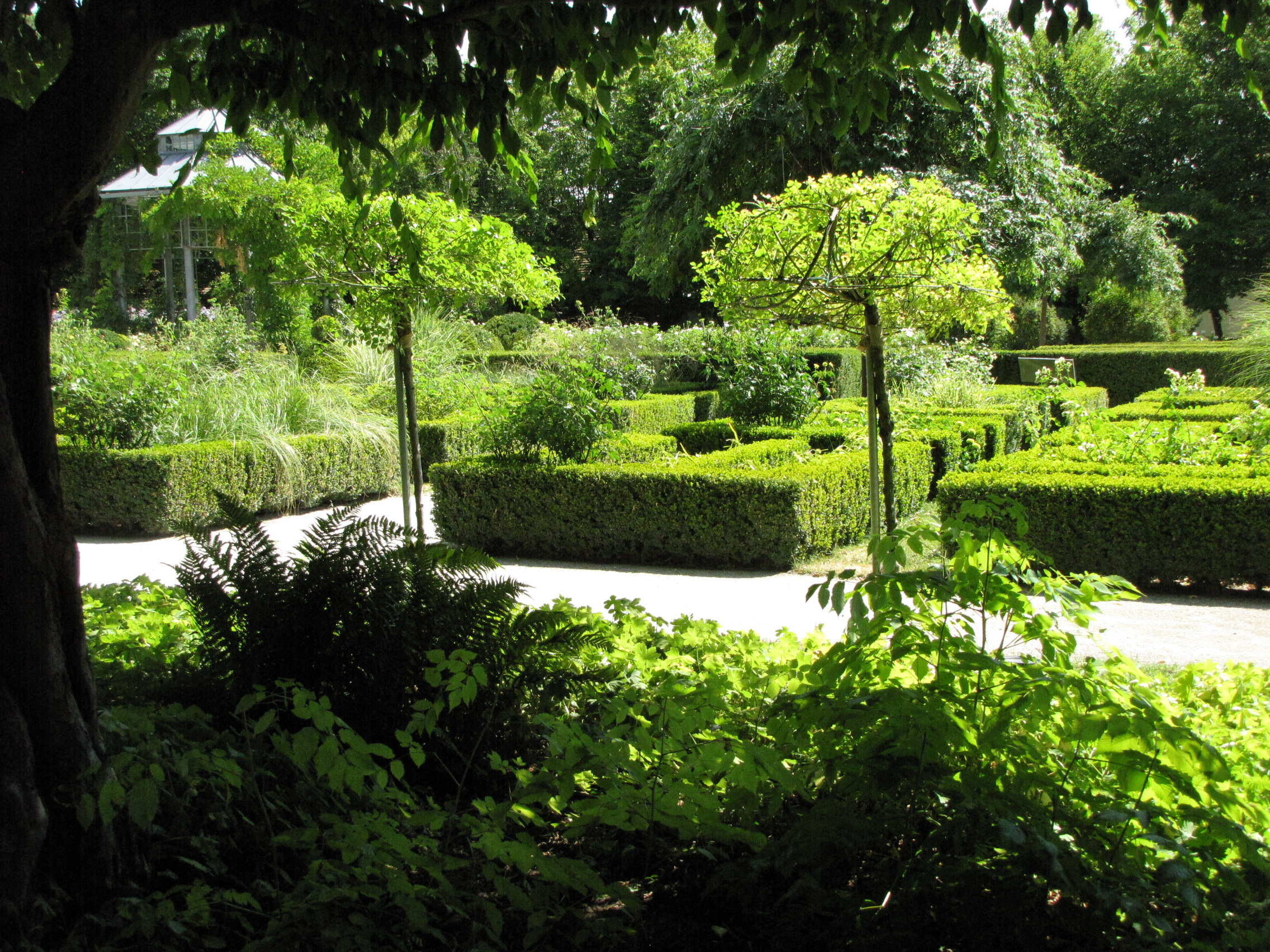
Castle garden

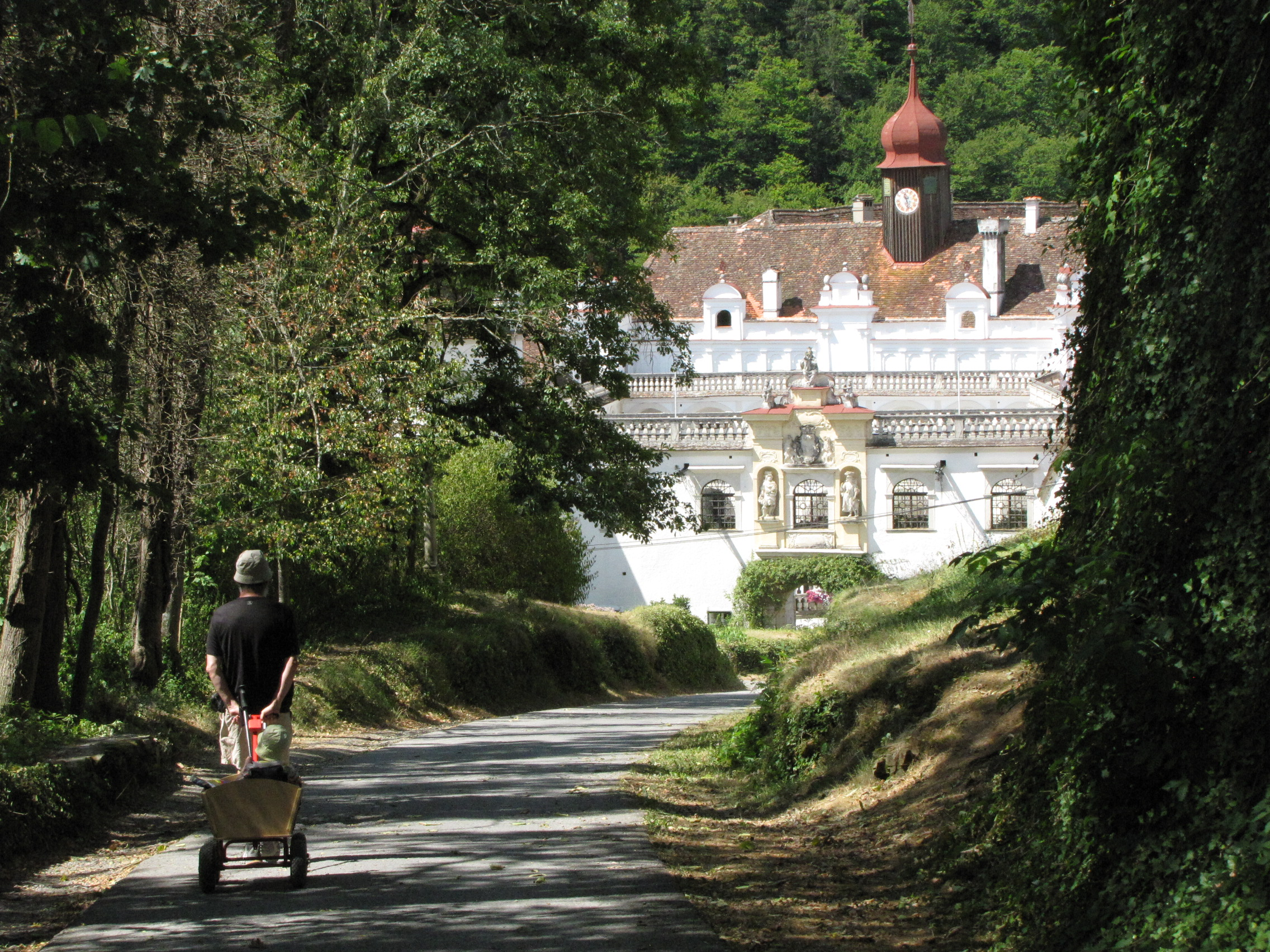
Castle Herberstein

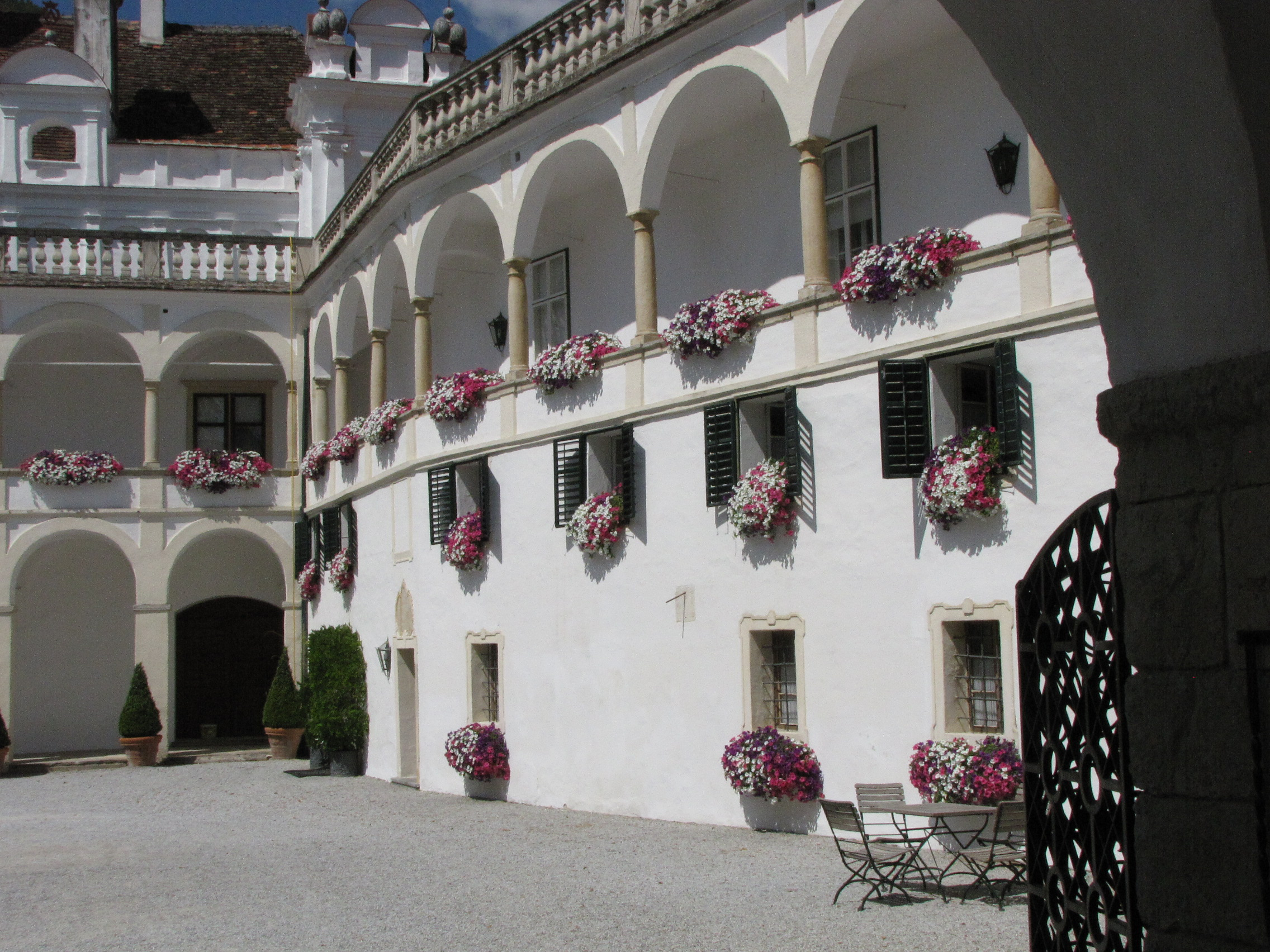
Castle Herberstein

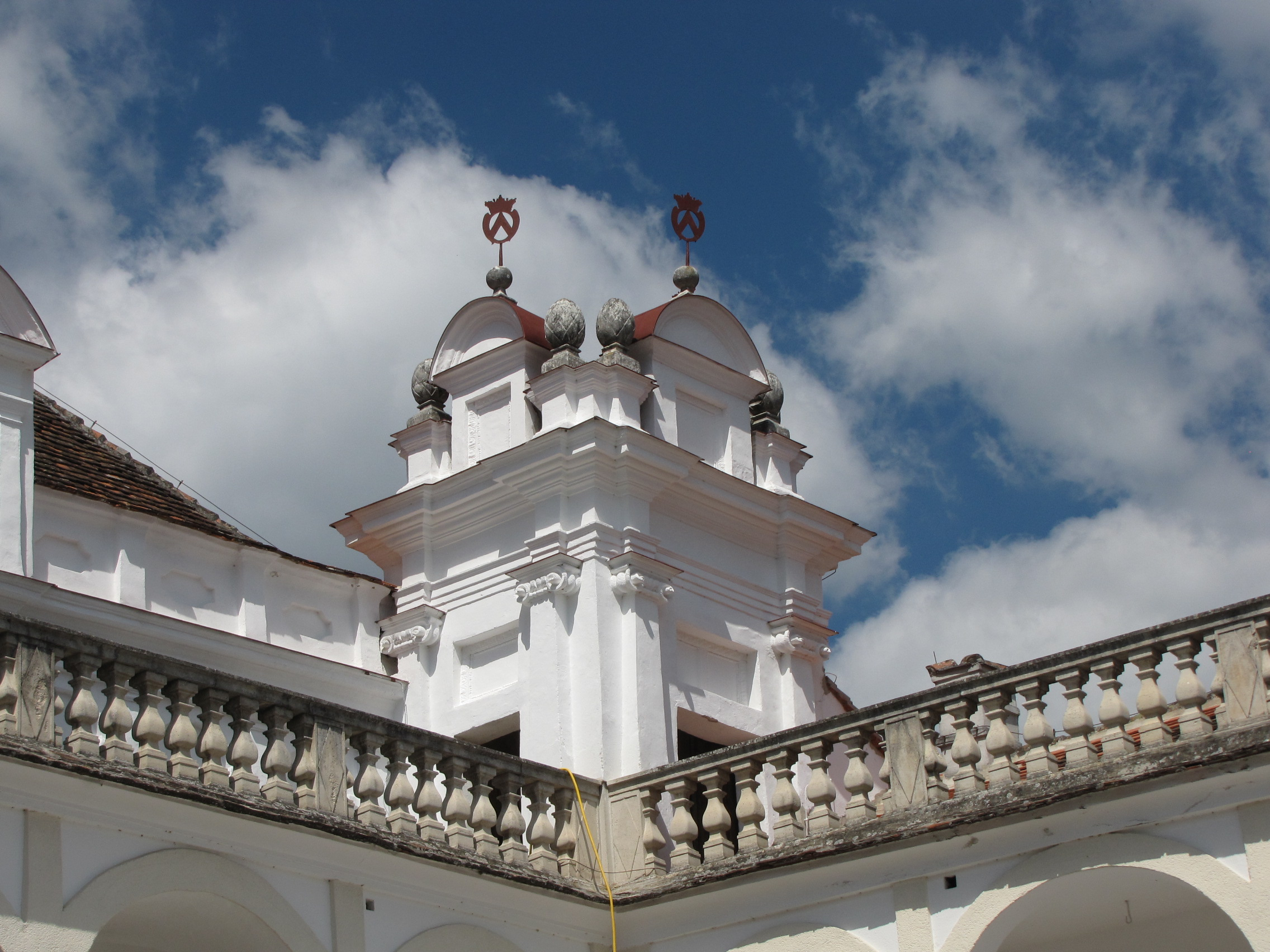
Castle Herberstein
