= Burg Neuhaus bei Stubenberg =

Renovated castle ruin in Stubenberg, Styria, Austria

- Stubenberg am See
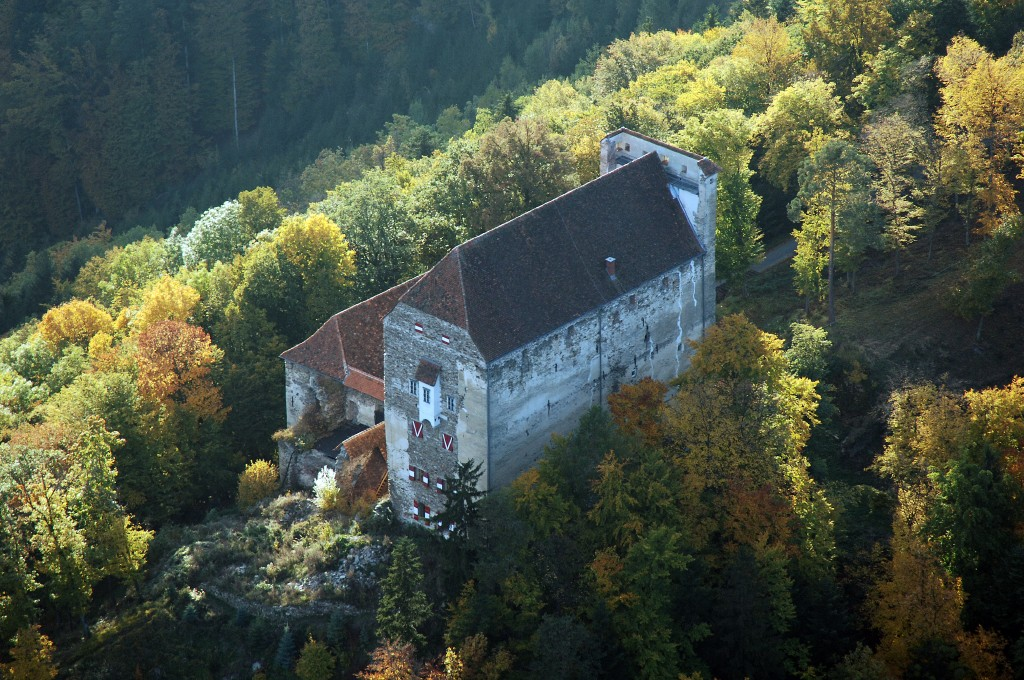
- Burg Neuhaus

Site information
- Type: Hill Castle
- Code: AT-6

Location
- Coordinates: 47.245560°N 15.779982°E
- Height: 553 m (AA)

Site history
- Built: around 1350 to 1375

Burg Neuhaus bei Stubenberg is a renovated castle ruin in Stubenberg, Styria. It is located above the ravine of the Feistritz river named Stubenbergklamm (Stubenberg ravine).

== History ==
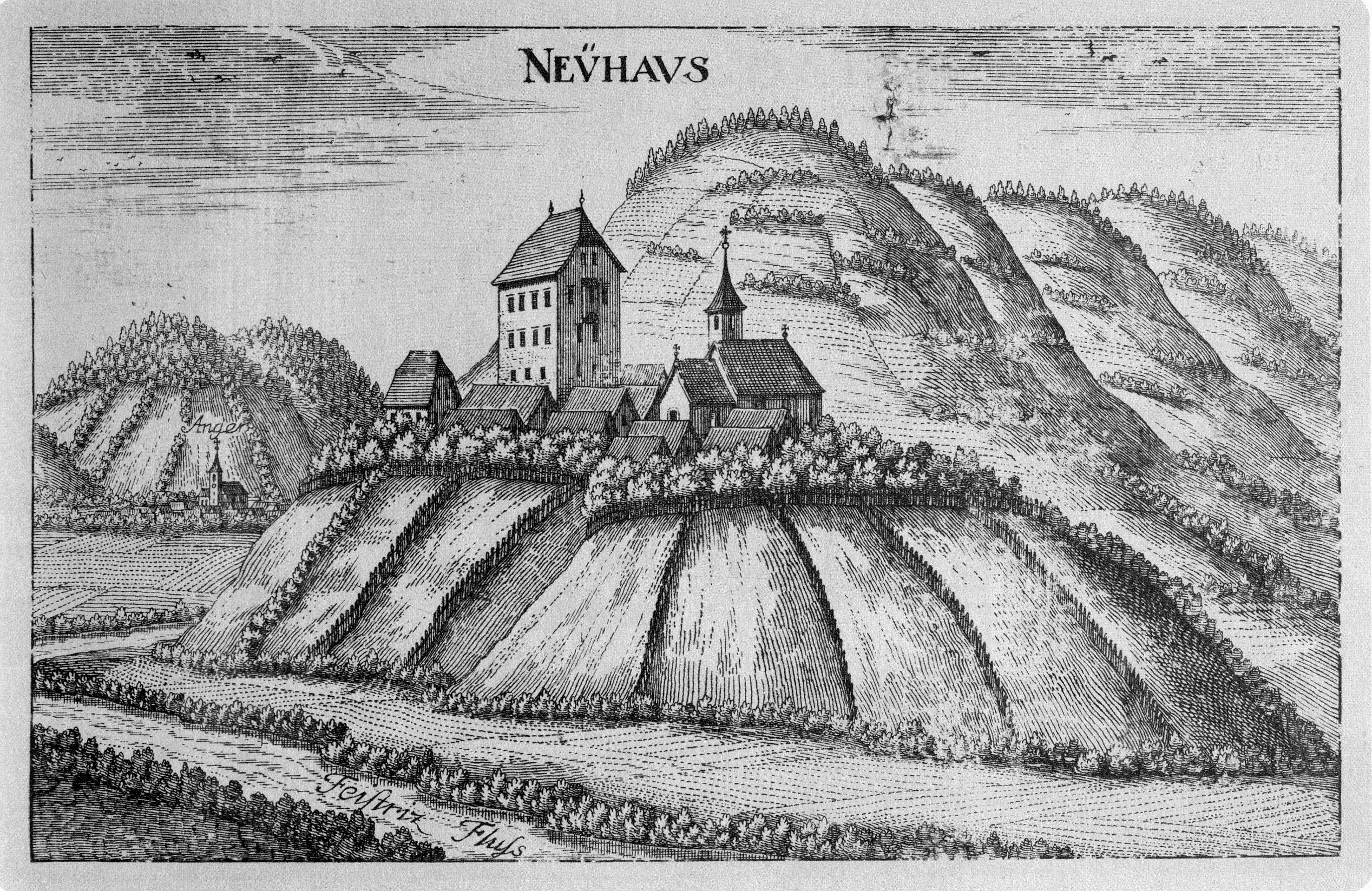
Vischer - the castle around 1670

The castle was constructed in the mid-14th century by the House of Stubenberg. Records from 1375 document the name "Hans from Neuhaus". Later, the Drachsler family and the counts of Wurmbrand owned the castle. The counts of Wurmbrand reinforced the castle as the Turks threatened the area. Administration of the castle was later relocated to Altschielleiten. Around 1800 the castle was destroyed almost totally by lightning.

Ongoing decay during the next 200 years almost totally destroyed the castle. Only due to the extraordinary strength and thickness of the walls enough substance remained to start a revitalization. Today, the reconstruction of the medieval tower house is almost finished. It is most likely the oldest high-rise building in Styria with a height of 32 metres (105 ft). Two adjoining buildings are being reconstructed.

The castle was assigned with the Styrian emblem.

== See also ==
- List of castles in Austria
