= Schönegg bei Pöllau =

- Former municipality
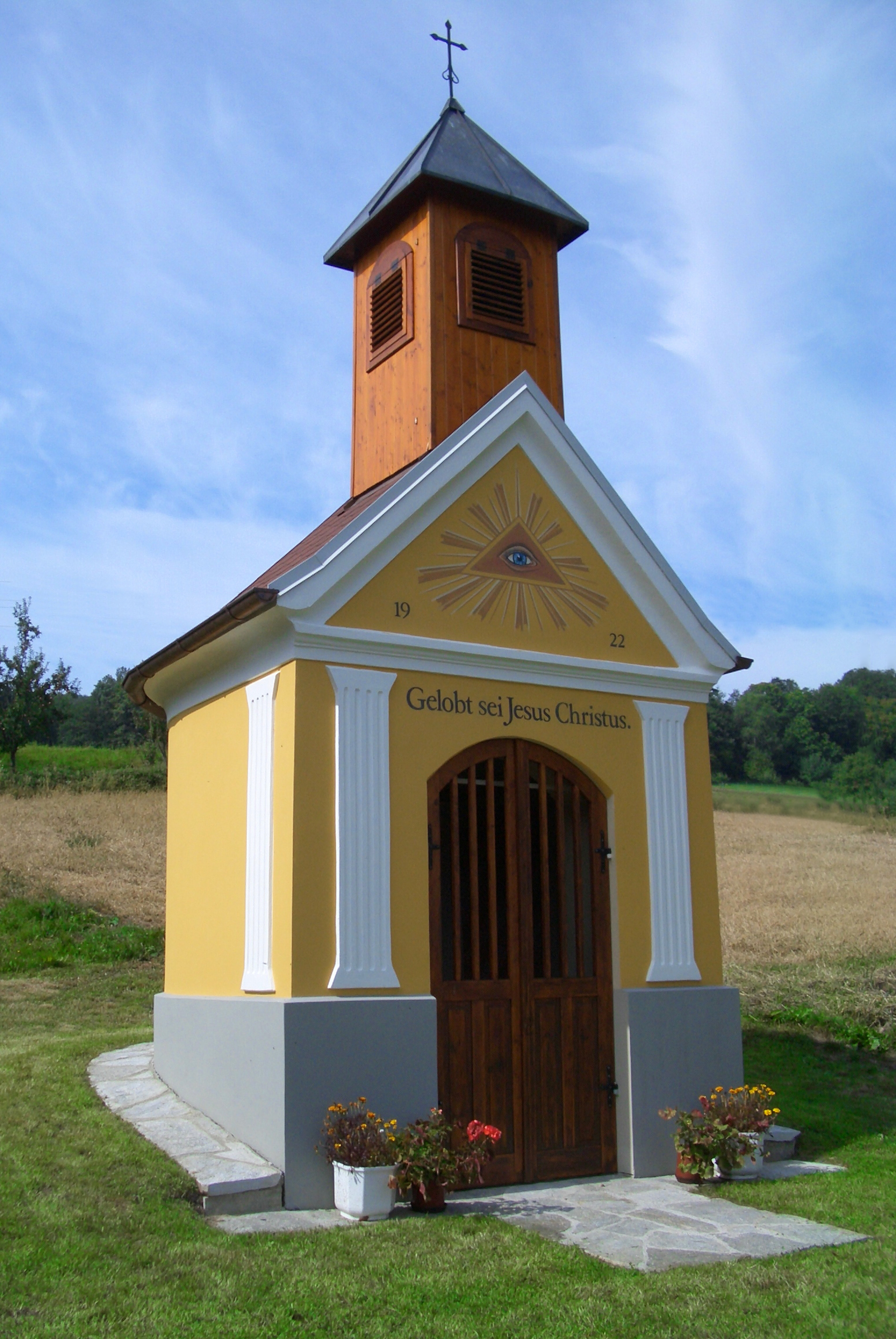
- Chapel in Scheiben (part of Schönegg)

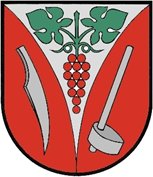
- Coat of arms

- Location within Austria
- Coordinates: 47°15′21″N 15°50′53″E
- Country: Austria
- State: Styria
- District: Hartberg-Fürstenfeld

Area
  - Total: 26.53 km^{2} (10.24 sq mi)
- Elevation: 587 m (1,926 ft)

Population (1 January 2016)
  - Total: 1,367
  - Density: 51.53/km^{2} (133.5/sq mi)
- Time zone: UTC+1 (CET)
  - Summer (DST): UTC+2 (CEST)
- Postal code: 8225, 8224, 8230
- Area code: 03335
- Vehicle registration: HB
- Website: www.schoenegg-poellau. steiermark.at

Schönegg bei Pöllau is a former municipality in the district of Hartberg-Fürstenfeld in Styria, Austria. Since the 2015 Styria municipal structural reform, it is part of the municipality Pöllau.
