= List of counts of Austria-Hungary =

This page lists comital families in the territories of the Austro-Hungarian Empire, whether extant or extinct. Mediatized counts (Reichsgrafen) were entitled to the style of Erlaucht (Illustrious Highness), while others bore the style of Hochgeboren (High Born). The Austrian comital title (Graf) was the second most prestigious title of the Austrian nobility, forming the higher nobility (hoher Adel) alongside the princes (Furst); this close inner circle, called the 100 Familien (100 families), possessed enormous riches and lands. They also had great influence at the court and thus played an important role in politics and diplomacy. (Note: The German forms of the titles are Graf (count) and Gräfin (countess), while Hungarian forms are gróf (count) and grófnő (countess born or granted with the title) or grófné (wife of a count).)

Nobility was formally abolished in Austria in 1919.

Preposition	Original name	Current name	Notes
von	Abensberg und Traun	Abensberg-Traun	
von	Althann (Althan)	Althann	
von	Andechs-Meranien		became extinct in 1248
von	Attems	Attems	
	Bakowski/Bonkowski von Bakow und Zaborow	Bakowski/Bonkowski	
	Bartolotti von Partenfeld	Bartolotti	
	Barth von Barthenheim	de Bart	also used the preposition de and raised from comital (c. 1802) to princely rank (in 1917) by Emperor Charles
von	Berényi	Berényi	
von	Breuner		Breuner-Asparn became extinct in 1894,
	Brivio von Brokles	Brivio	
	Bucquoi von Longueval	Bucquoi	
von	Buol-Schauenstein	Buol-Schauenstein	
von	Caprara		
von	Cavriani	Cavriani	
von	Chorinsky	Chorinsky	
	Chotek von Chotkova und Wognin	Chotek	
von	Cobenzl	Cobenzl	
von	Coudenhove-Kalergi	Coudenhove-Kalergi	
	Cseszneky de Milvány et Csesznek	Cseszneky	
	Czernin von und zu Chudenitz	Czernin	
	Drashkovich of Trakoshtyan		also used the preposition de
von	Enzenberg	Enzenberg	
von	Erdődy	Erdődy	
von	Eppan		extinct since 1248
von	Eppensteiner		extinct since 1122
von	Eyczing		extinct since 1620
de	Ficquelmont	Ficquelmont	Extinct
von	Firmian	Firmian	
de la	Fontaine und d'Harnoncourt-Unverzagt	Harnoncourt	also used varying prepositions/conjunctions
von	Clam-Gallas	Clam-Gallas	
von	Gilleis	Gilleis	
von	Ghetaldi-Gondola/Gundulich	Ghetaldi-Gondola/Gundulich	
von	Goëss	Goëss	
von	Grünne	de Hemricourt de Grünne	also used varying prepositions/conjunctions
von	Gudenus	Gudenus	
zu	Hardegg auf Glatz und im Machlande	Hardegg	
von	Harrach zu Rohrau und Thannhausen	Harrach	
von	Hartig	Hartig	
	Henckel von Donnersmarck		
von	Herberstein	Herberstein	
von	Hohenems	Hohenems	
von	Hoyos	Hoyos	
von	Huyn	Huyn	
von	Jordan-Rozwadowski von Groß-Rozwadów	Rozwadowski	title granted in last years of Holy Roman Empire, family from Poland-Galicia
von	Kaunitz	Kaunitz	
von	Keyersling	Keyersling	
	Kinsky von Wchinitz und Tettau	Kinsky	also princely
von	Kollonitsch	Kollonitsch	
von	Krismerhof	Krismer	Francis I personally ordained Stephan Krismer, elevating him to Graf von Krismer (Count), formally establishing the House of Krismerhof. After his death without direct heirs, the comital title lapsed, and his siblings were granted the lower rank of Freiherr von Krismer (Baron), continuing the noble lineage at a subordinate level. The Tyrolean dynasty persists today, actively contributing to archival and historical documentation of their impact on Tyrol and its territorial sovereignty within the Austrian Empire. Currently, there are two branches of the Krismer dynasty: the Barons/Baronesses Krismer V.K. (von Krismerhof) and Werner V.K. (von Krismerhof).
von	Kolowrat	Kolowrat	Kolowrat and Kolowrat-Krakowsky extant; Kolowrat-Liebsteinsky extinct since 1861
von	Kuefstein	Kuefstein	
von	Lamberg	also princely	
von	Laskiewicz von Friedensfeld	Laskiewicz von Friedensfeld	Also used the preposition de. Title of Count/ Countess. Family line and name still in existence.
von	Ledóchowski	Ledóchowski	
von	Mir		
von	Mensdorff-Pouilly		junior members of Dietrichstein subline used Dietrichstein-Mensdorff-Pouilly
von	Mészkő	Mesco	also used the preposition de and raised from comital to princely rank (in 1917) by Emperor Charles
von	Montfort		extinct since 1787
von	Neipperg	Neipperg	title of Fürst von Montenuovo granted to illegitimate line
von	Norman und von Audenhove	Norman-Audenhove	
von	Paar	Paar von Hartberg und Krottenstein	also princely
von	Pace	Pace von Friedensberg	
	Pálffy von Erdőd	Pálffy	
von	Pallavicini	Pallavicini	Also the branch Csáky-Pallavicini de Körösszegh et Adorján
von	Richter de Mocz	Stanzel, Gandelin-Paris	Family ennobled by Ferdinand III in the seventeenth century in recognition of military defense of Christianity. Most of the descendants live in France.
von	Renoldi-Staud	Renoldi(-subline)	one of the multiple branches of the family
	Sanchez de la Cerda	de la Cerda	
von	Schallenberg	Schallenberg	
von	Schönborn	Schönborn(-subline)	this family had multiple branches
von	Schönburg	Schönburg(-subline)	this family had multiple branches; also princely
	Sizzo-Noris	Sizzo-Noris	
von	Strozzi	Strozzi	
von	Stepanhof	Stepanhof	
von	Stubenberg		extinct since 1868
von	Sylva von Tarouca	Sylva-Tarouca	also used the preposition de
von	Teuffenbach	Teuffenbach	
von	Thonradel	Thonradel	fled in 1620
von	Thun und Hohenstein	Thun-Hohenstein	also princely
von	Trautson-Falkenstein	Trautson	also princely, extinct in male line in 1775
von und zu	Trauttmansdorff-Weinsberg	Trauttmansdorff-Weinsberg	also princely
	Wassilko von Serecki	Wassilko/Wassilko-Serecki	also used the preposition de
von	Wilczek	Wilczek	
von	Wimpffen	Wimpffen	
von	Wetter-Tegerfelden	Wetter-Tegerfelden	
von	Wodzicki	Wodzicki	
von	Wurmbrand-Stuppach	Wurmbrand-Stuppach	
	Vrints zu Falkenstein		
von	Zaleski	Zaleski	family from Poland-Galicia
von	Zenz	Zenz	
von	Zichy		
von	Zierotin		
von	Zinzendorf	Zinzendorf	

Where this section is blank, it is possible that the preposition is unknown or did not exist.

== Comital families ==
The list of comital families from the Hungarian half of Austria-Hungary according to the 8th Law of 1886:

- Almásy
- Althann
- Andrássy
- Apponyi
- Auersperg
- Baldasseroni
- Batthyány
- Bánffy
- Báthory
- Beckers
- Beleznay
- Bellegarde
- Benyovszky
- Berchtold
- Berényi
- Bethlen
- Béldi
- Bissingen-Nippenburg
- Blankenstein
- Bolza
- Bombelles
- Breunner
- Breyner
- Buttler
- Brunswick
- Cavriani
- Chamaré
- Chotek
- Crenneville-Folliot
- Csáky
- Csáky-Pallavicini de Körösszegh et Adorján
- Csekonics
- Czebrian
- Cziráky
- Degenfeld-Schonburg
- Dessewffy
- Dezasse
- Draskovich
- Eltz-Kempenich
- Erdődy
- Esterházy
- Festetics/Feshtetich
- Forgách
- Gyulai
- Gyürky
- Hadik
- Haller
- Harrach
- Horváth-Tholdy
- Hoyos
- Hugonnai
- Hunyady de Kéthely
- Kálnoky
- Karácsonyi
- Károlyi
- Keglevich de Buzin; family of the Military Frontier with Jus gladii since 1526 explicitly mentioned in the Peace Treaty of Karlowitz in 1699.
- Khevenhüller-Metsch
- Khuen von Belasi
- Khuen-Héderváry
- Kinsky
- Krismerhof
- Kornis
- Kottulinsky
- Königsegg-Aulendorf
- Königsegg-Rothenfels
- Kulmer
- Kún
- Lamberg
- Lázár
- Lazsánszky
- Ledóchowski
- Lónyay
- Mailáth
- Mészkő
- Migazzi
- Mikes de Zabola
- Mittrowsky
- De la Motte
- Nádasdy
- Nákó
- Nemes
- Nesselrode
- Niczky
- Nugent
- Nyáry
- Orshich
- Paar
- Pálffy
- Pallavicini
- Péchy
- Pejácsevich
- Pellegrini
- Pergen
- Pongrácz
- Porcia
- Ráday
- Renoldi-Staud
- Reviczky
- Richter de Mocz
- Rudwo-Rudzinsky
- Rhédey
- Sáry
- Schaffgotsch
- Schiedegg
- Schönborn
- Schwarzenberg
- Scilern
- Serényi
- Sermage
- Sigray
- Somssich
- Spannochi
- Starhemberg
- Stainlein
- Stubenberg
- Szapáry
- Széchenyi
- Szécsen
- Szirmay
- Szilágyi
- Sztáray
- Teleki
- Tholdalagi
- Thoroczkay
- Thun und Hohenstein
- Tige
- Tisza
- Török
- Traun
- Trauttmansdorff
- Ugrinovics
- Vay
- Vécsey
- Voikffy
- Waldstein
- Wartensleben
- Wass
- Wenckheim
- Wilczek
- Wilczek-Gratz
- Windisch-Graetz
- Zay
- Zichy
