= Trnávka =

Trnávka may refer to places:

== Czech Republic ==
- Trnávka (Nový Jičín District), a municipality and village in the Moravian-Silesian
- Trnávka (Pardubice District), a municipality and village in the Pardubice Region
- Městečko Trnávka, a municipality and village in the Pardubice Region
- Lipník nad Bečvou VII-Trnávka, a village and part of Lipník nad Bečvou in the Olomouc Region

== Slovakia ==
- Trnávka, Dunajská Streda District, a municipality and village in the Trnava Region
- Trnávka, Trebišov District, a municipality and village in the Košice Region
- Trnávka, a part of Bratislava-Ružinov
- Trnávka river, a river in the Trnava Region
