= Gedeon Ráday =

Gedeon Ráday may refer to:

- Gedeon Ráday (writer) (1713–92), Hungarian poet, translator and politician, see Ferenc Kazinczy
- Gedeon Ráday (minister of defence) (1841–83), Hungarian politician
- Gedeon Ráday (interior minister) (1872–1937), Hungarian politician
