= Ráday family =

Hungarian noble family

House of Ráday
- Hungarian noble family
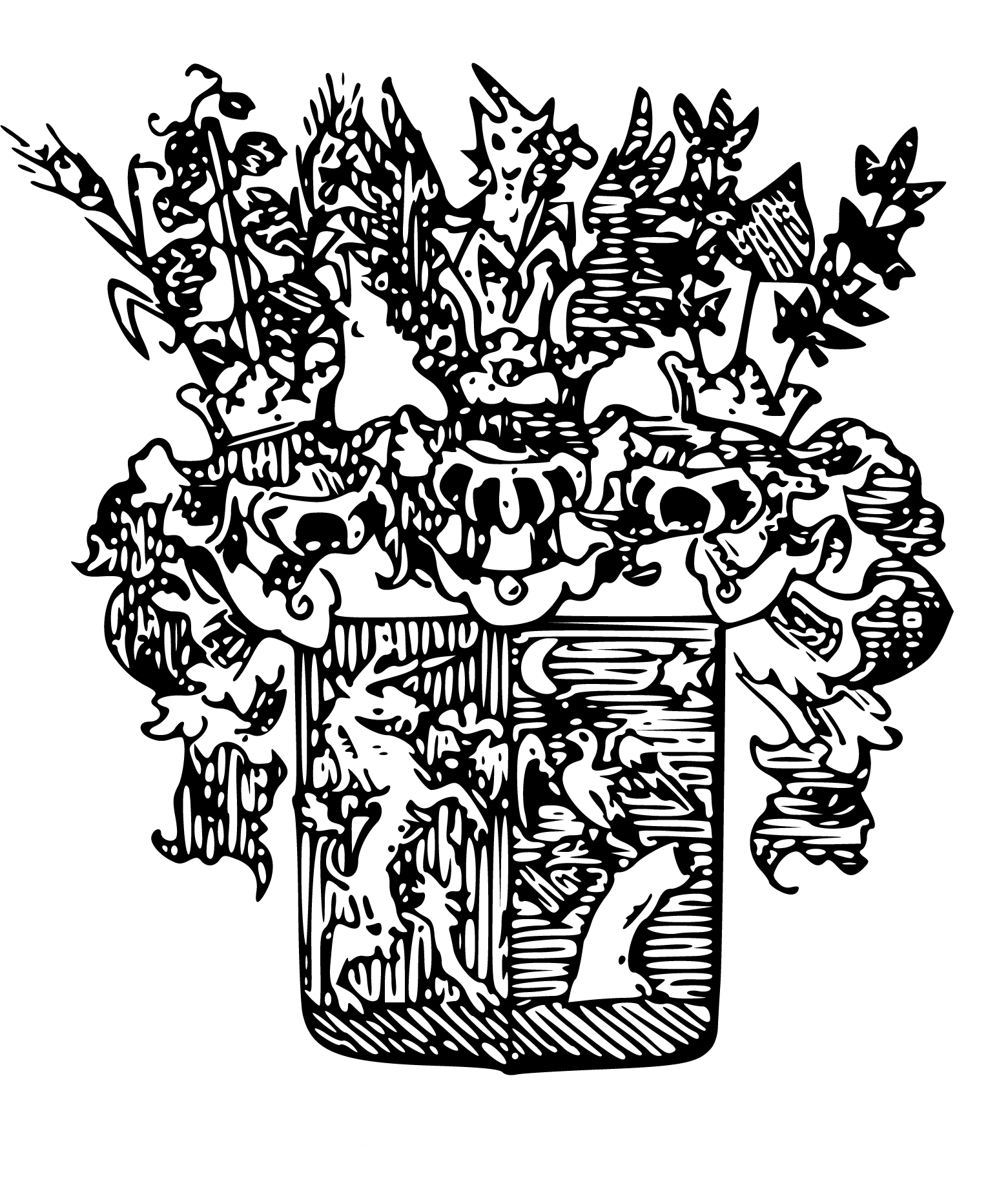
- The coat of arms of the Ráday that was first granted to Máté I Ráday in 1552 and later expanded with the countly crowns.
- Parent family: Rátót
- Origin: Kingdom of Hungary
- Founded: 14th century
- Founder: Balázs I Ráday
- Final head: Count Gedeon Ráday de Ráda
- Historic seat: Ráday Castle, Pécel, Hungary
- Titles: Count
- Members: Gedeon Ráday (interior minister) Gedeon Ráday (minister of defence)

The Ráday family (Hungarian pronunciation: [raːdɒi]) is a Hungarian noble family, descended from the Genus Rátót. The family rose to prominence in the 18th century, when they were raised to the rank of barons in 1782 and eventually that of counts in 1790. The family played a significant role in the development of literature and Calvinism during the Hungarian Enlightenment. Members of the family were also involved in the Ottoman Wars, numerous civil wars against the House of Habsburg and the eradication of the Hungarian highwaymen known as the betyárs.

== History ==
Genus Rátót, the clan from which the Ráday emerged, came to Hungary from Naples in the 11th century, under the reign of King Coloman. The Rádays' earliest known ancestor from this clan is Rathold, who eventually assumed the position of ispán of Somogy in 1203.

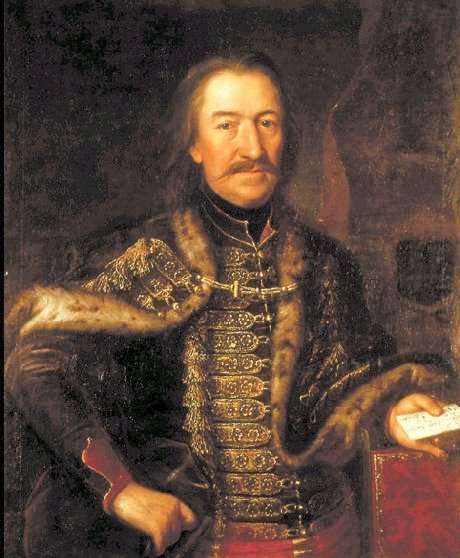
Portrait of Pál Ráday (1677–1733) by Ádám Mányoki.

The first occurrence of the Ráday name can be traced to 1348, when an obscure charter mentioned Balázs I Ráday and his son Jakab. In 1545, István I Ráday, a direct descendant of Balázs, attained the position of sheriff (szolgabíró) of Pest. In the same century, Máté I Ráday was appointed castellan of Dévény by Louis II, and of Babócsa by Ferdinand I. The records about Máté's military career are somewhat conflicting as subsequent Rádays mainly credited him with the defence of Babócsa Castle, not the ensuing Siege of Kőszeg, at which he was supposedly present. For Máté's victory over the Ottoman forces at Babócsa, King Ferdinand permitted the further expansion of the Ráday sigil. Thus, the linden branch and leaf were added onto the coat of arms of the family, denoting its connection to the Rátóts.

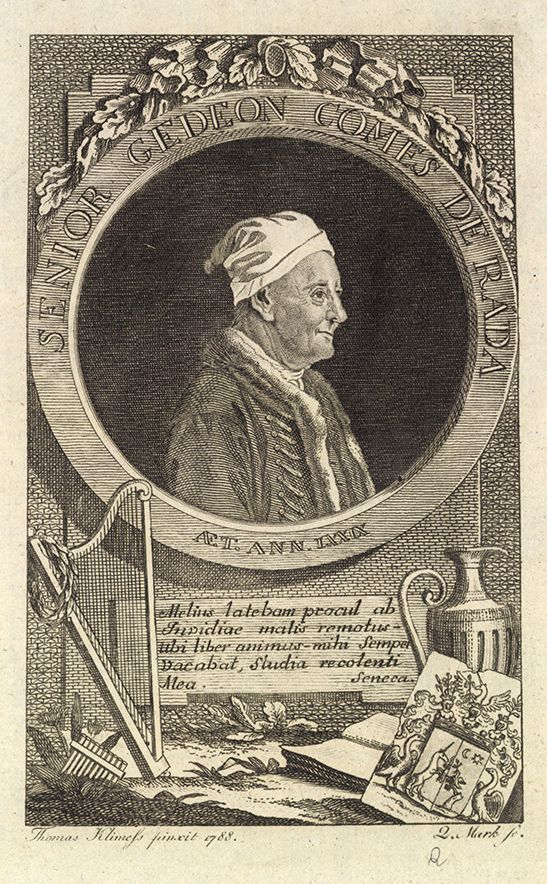
Count Gedeon Ráday de Ráda (1713–1792), writer and poet of the Hungarian Enlightenment.

Maté's son, Péter, went onto lead a Šajkaši army and was eventually captured by the Ottomans. Another member of the family, Simon Ráday was elevated to the position of canon of Szepes in the 1500s. The steady rise of the family continued over the coming century, as András Ráday, grandson of István I, was asked to represent Nógrád at the Royal Diet of 1649 in Pozsony. His son, Gáspár II Ráday (1682–1711), assumed the same position in Pest at the subsequent diets, solidifying the political emergence of the family.

Under Pál Ráday, the family attained a newfound prominence in the political and cultural scene of Hungary. In 1697, Ráday joined the 12,000 strong army of the Kuruc, Simon Forgách and marched against the Ottomans. In 1699, Pál assumed the role of notary of Nógrád County and continued to build up his family's wealth. He began serving as the trusted chancellor of Francis II Rákóczi in October 1703. Through his important position within the court of Rákóczi, Ráday became involved in the ensuing failed rebellion against the Habsburgs. After the Treaty of Szatmár, Ráday returned to Hungary from his exile in Poland and became an ardent defender of the Protestant nobility at the Diet of 1712, as the representative of Nógrád. Through his marriage to Klára Kajaly and her sizeable dowry, Pál Ráday could commence the construction of the family's seat at Pécel, laying the groundwork for what would become the Ráday Castle under his son's supervision. Pál also began the famous Ráday Library, a collection of books which would be greatly expanded by his successor and would go onto form an integral part of the Hungarian Enlightenment.

Pál's son, Gedeon Ráday, cemented the family's meteoric rise through his numerous contributions to Hungarian literature as a renowned writer, poet and collector. Between 1755 and 1774, Gedeon transformed his father's estate at Pécel into a baroque palace with the help of architect, János Mayerhoffer. Eventually, Ráday was elevated to the rank of baron on 8 February 1782 and on 18 February 1790, he was made a count by Joseph II.

Later members of the family, such as Count Gedeon Ráday de Ráda (1841–1883) and his eponymous son, would become high ranking ministers within the Hungarian government.

== Ráday Castle ==
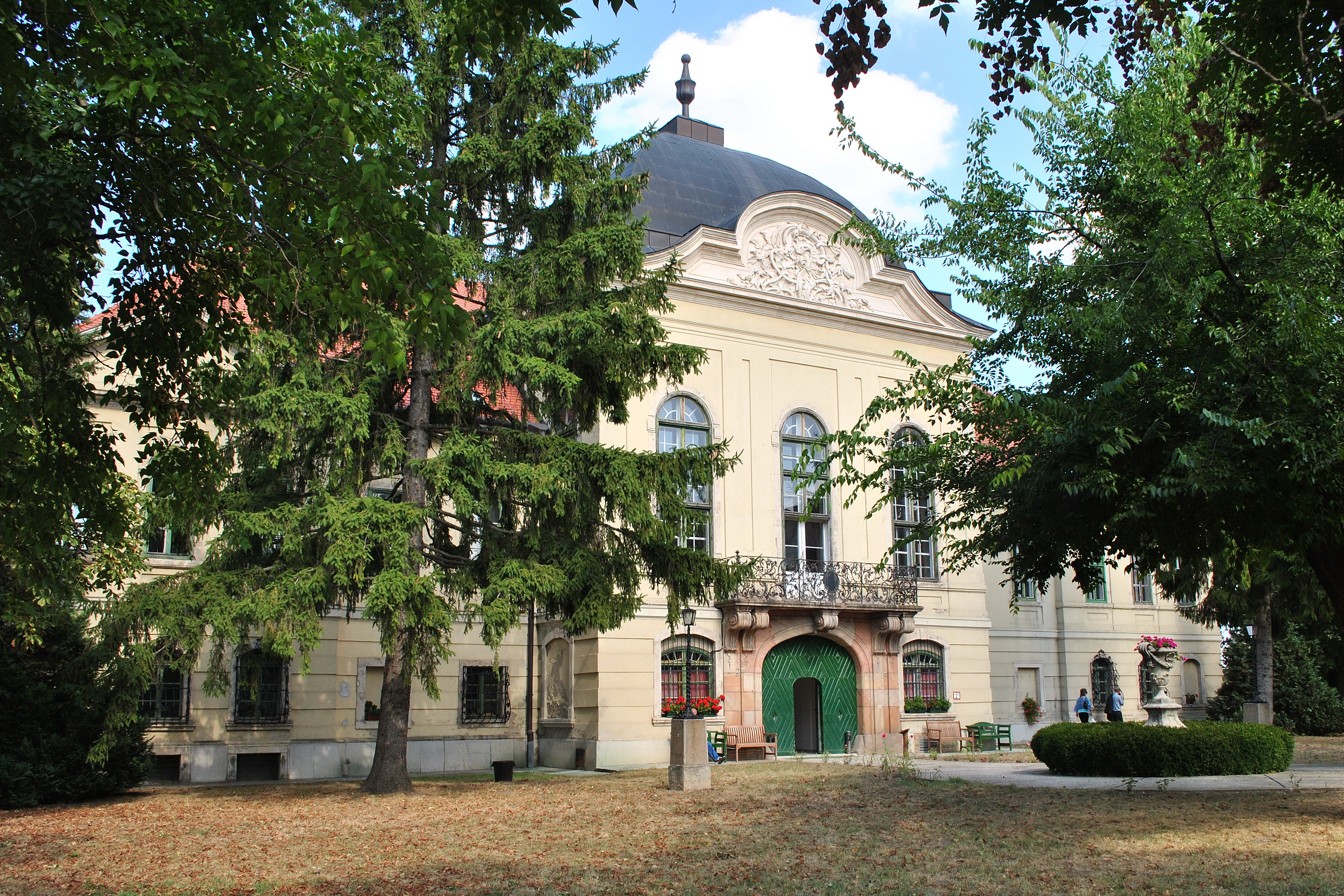
The Ráday Castle, which served as the family's historic seat in Pécel.

The family's historic palatial seat is located at Pécel, Hungary. The palace was built by Pál Ráday (1677–1733) chancellor and diplomat of Francis II Rákóczi, and his son Gedeon Ráday (1713–1792) between 1677 and 1770.
