= Marton (name) =

Marton or Márton can be both a given name and a surname. The Hungarian name Márton is the Hungarian-language form of the Latin name Martinus. Female counterpart of the given name: Martina (given name).

== Given name ==
- Márton Balázs (1929–2016), Romanian mathematician of Hungarian descent
- Marton Csokas (born 1966), New Zealand actor
- Márton Fucsovics (born 1992), Hungarian tennis player
- Márton Kövér (born 1987), Hungarian canoeist
- Márton Melléthei-Barna, Hungarian politician
- Márton Vas (born 1980), Hungarian ice hockey player

== Surname ==
- Alatia Marton (1894–1972), American silent-film actress
- Andrew Marton (1904–1992), Hungarian-American film director
- Áron Márton (1896–1980), Roman Catholic bishop
- Brian Marton (born 1970), Australian sprint canoer
- Dana Marton, American romance novelist
- Edvin Marton (born 1974), Hungarian violinist and composer
- Ervin Marton (1912–1968), Hungarian and French artist and photographer
- Éva Marton (born 1943), Hungarian operatic soprano
- Ference Marton (born 1939), Swedish educational psychologist
- George Marton (1839–1905) (1835–1905), British Conservative politician
- Jack Marton (born 1992), Australian taekwondo practitioner
- Javier Martón (born 1999), Spanish footballer
- Jirina Marton (born 1946), Czech-born Canadian artist and illustrator
- Kati Marton (born 1949), American author and journalist
- László Marton (director) (1943–2019), Hungarian theatrical director
- Sandra Marton, American novelist
- Sandy Marton (born 1959), Croatian singer
- Avinoam Marton, Israeli drummer and singer, member of Teapacks between 1991 and 1994
