= Maglód =

- Town
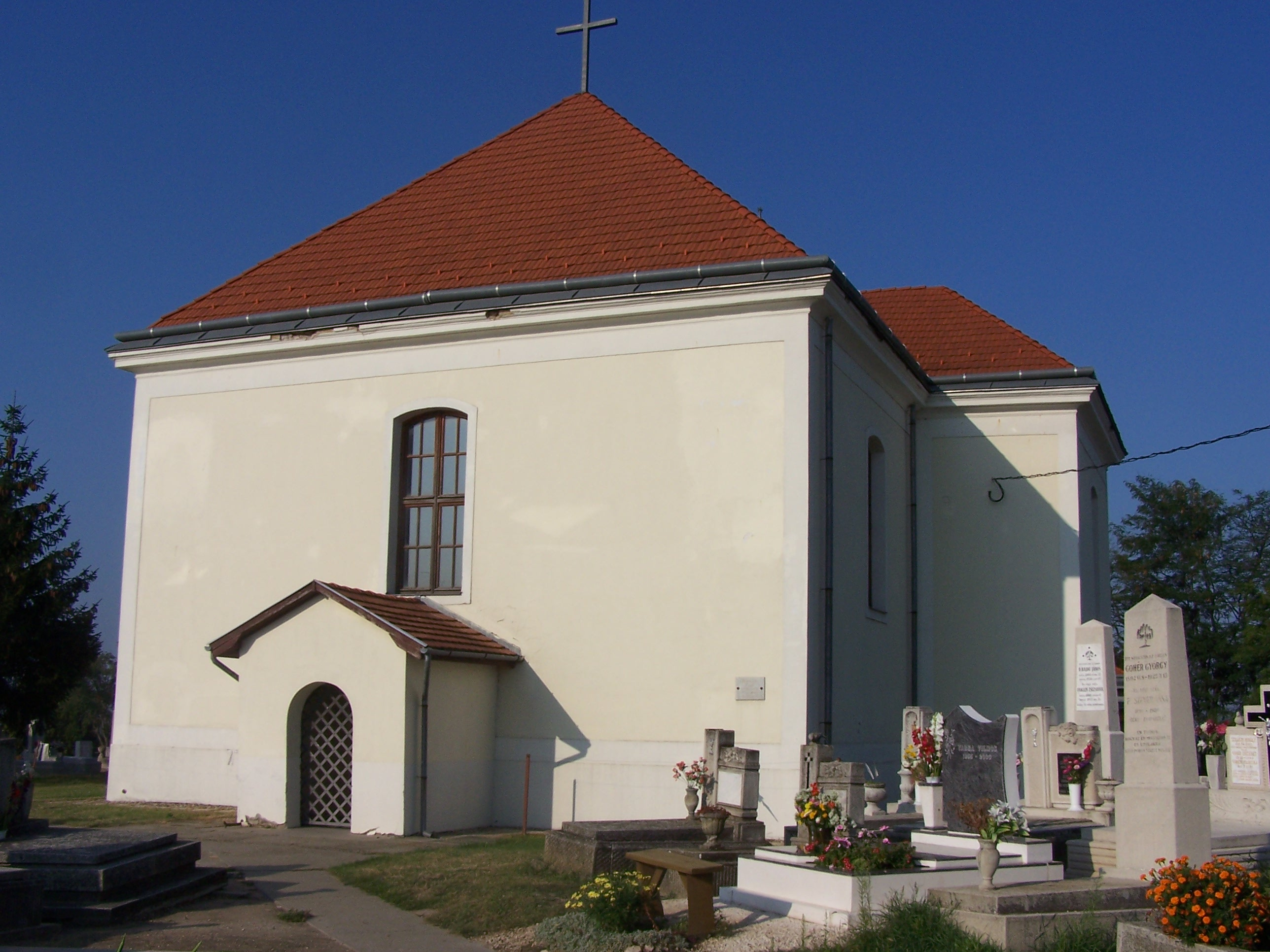
- The Lutheran Church of Maglód

- Flag Coat of arms

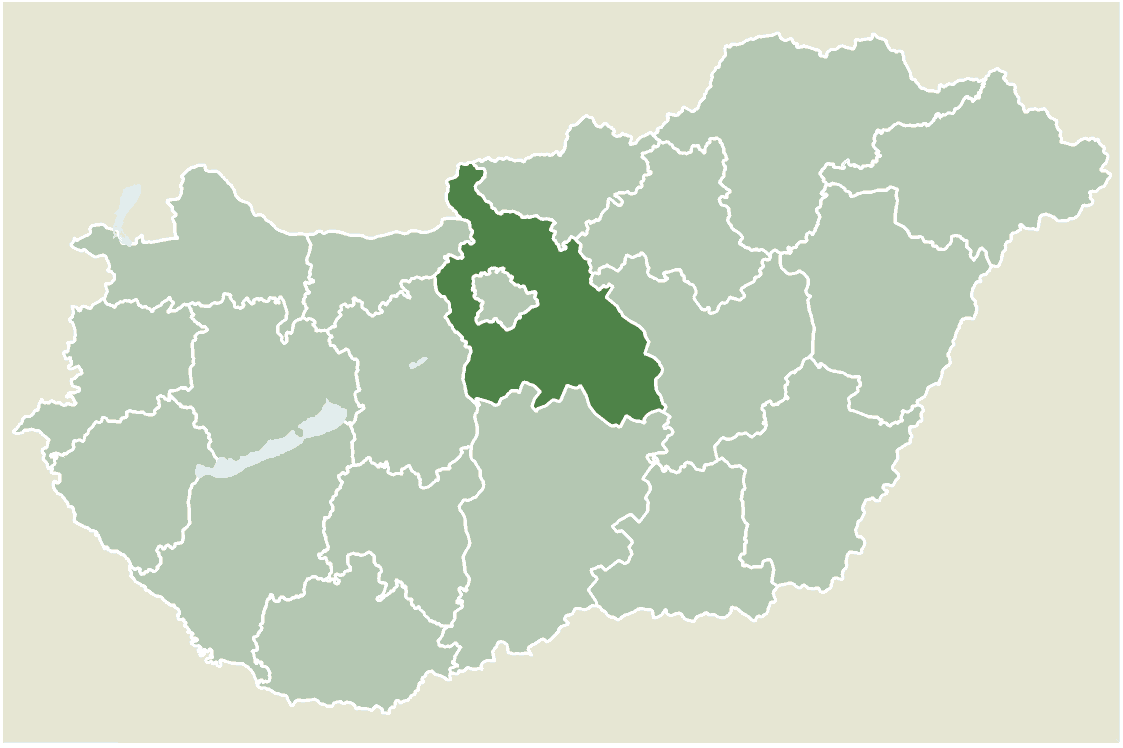
- Location of Pest county in Hungary

- Location of Maglód
- Coordinates: 47.44388°N 19.35261°E
- Country: Hungary
- County: Pest
- District: Vecsés

Area
  - Total: 22.37 km^{2} (8.64 sq mi)

Population (2021)
  - Total: 12,635
  - Density: 537.85/km^{2} (1,393.0/sq mi)
- Time zone: UTC+1 (CET)
  - Summer (DST): UTC+2 (CEST)
- Postal code: 2234
- Area code: (+36) 29
- Website: www.maglod.hu

Maglód is a town in Pest County, Budapest metropolitan area, Hungary.

== History ==
The name of Maglód was first mentioned in about 1200 by Anonymus in his narrative, according to which the grandfathers of the seventh leader of the conquest, Tétény (hu), were Gyula and Zombor, from whom the inhabitants of Maglód descend. (Note: The identities of Gyula and Zombor are uncertain. According to historian György Györffy, they can be identified as Gyula II and Gyula III (aka Zombor) respectively.)

In the 14th century Maglód was the property of the Kátai and Bodonyi families. During the period of Ottoman Hungary and during Rákóczi's War of Independence, the village was depopulated. The town was reinstated after 1710, with its new inhabitants composed mainly of Slovak serfs from Nógrád. In the 18th century, the Fáy (hu) and Ráday (hu) families owned the village.

On 1 July 2007 the village was given the status of town.

== Notable people ==
- Lajos Takács, mathematician

== Transportation ==
Maglód can be reached by bus or train.

== Demographics ==
- The ethnic composition of the population: 98% Hungarian, 1.5% Slovak, 0.5% other (Gypsy, German, Romanian)
- Religious composition of the population: Catholic 43%, Evangelical 18%, Reformed 13%, Other or Unknown 26%
- With secondary education: 33% of the population
- With higher education: 7.8% (2001)

== Sights ==
- Petőfi statue
- Trianon monument

== Twin towns – sister cities ==
Maglód is twinned with:

- Bene, Ukraine
- Dlhá Ves, Slovakia
- Lueta, Romania
- Mýtne Ludany, Slovakia
