= Mihály Dömötör =

Hungarian politician (1875–1962)

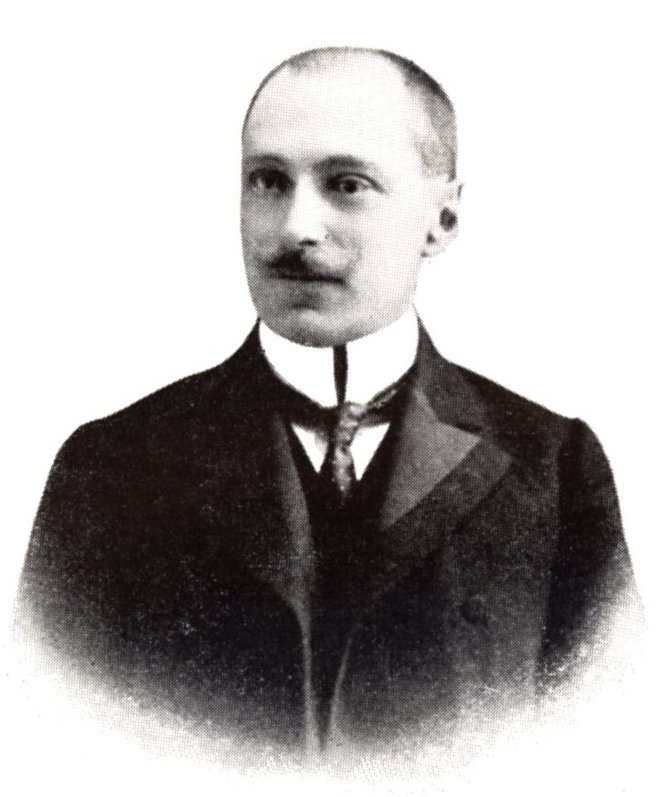

Minister of the Interior of Hungary
- In office 19 April 1920 – 19 July 1920
- Preceded by: Sándor Simonyi-Semadam
- Succeeded by: Gyula Ferdinandy

Personal details
- Born: 1 October 1875 Binóc, Austria-Hungary
- Died: 2 February 1962 (aged 86) Fajsz, Hungary
- Party: KNEP, Unity Party
- Profession: lawyer, politician

Dr. Mihály Dömötör (1 October 1875 in Bíňovce – 2 February 1962) was a Hungarian politician, who served as Interior Minister for three months in 1920. His most famous order was the 1550/1920, which dissolved the freemason companies.

Political offices
Preceded by Sándor Simonyi-Semadam	Minister of the Interior; 1920	Succeeded by Gyula Ferdinandy
