= Carpathian Ruthenia during World War II =

Region of Hungary from 1939 to 1945

Governorate of Subcarpathia Kárpátaljai Kormányzóság
- Region of the Kingdom of Hungary
- 1939–1945
- Flag Coat of arms

- Capital: Ungvár
- Area
  - 1941: 11,583 km^{2} (4,472 sq mi)
- Population
  - 1941: 621,916
- Government
  - Type: Military, later civil administration
- Regent's Commissioner
  - 1939–1940: Zsigmond Perényi
  - 1940–1941: Miklós Kozma
  - 1942–1944: Vilmos Pál Tomcsányi
  - 1944: András Vincze
- Historical era: World War II
  - Occupation: 15–18 March 1939
  - Military administration: 18 March 1939
  - Slovak–Hungarian War: 23–31 March 1939
  - Annexation: 23 June 1939
  - Civil administration: 7 July 1939
  - Military operational zone: 1 April 1944
  - Soviet invasion: 2–28 October 1945
  - Paris Peace Treaty: 10 February 1947
- Political subdivisions: Administrative delegations: Bereg; Máramaros; Ung
Preceded by	Succeeded by
Carpatho-Ukraine; Slovak Republic	Zakarpattia Oblast
- Today part of: Slovakia; Ukraine

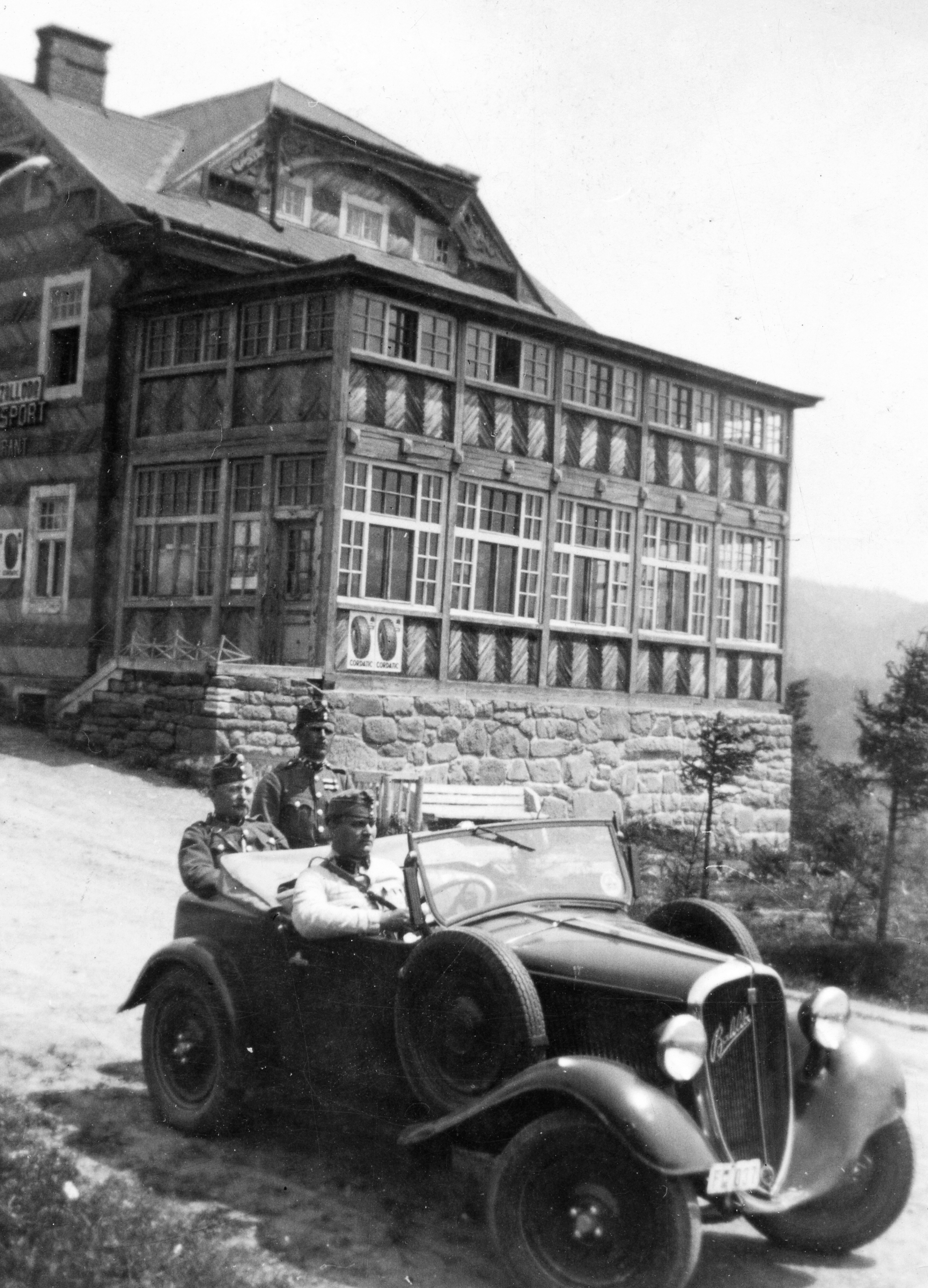
Hungarian soldiers in a Fiat Balilla 508 at Uzhok pass in 1939

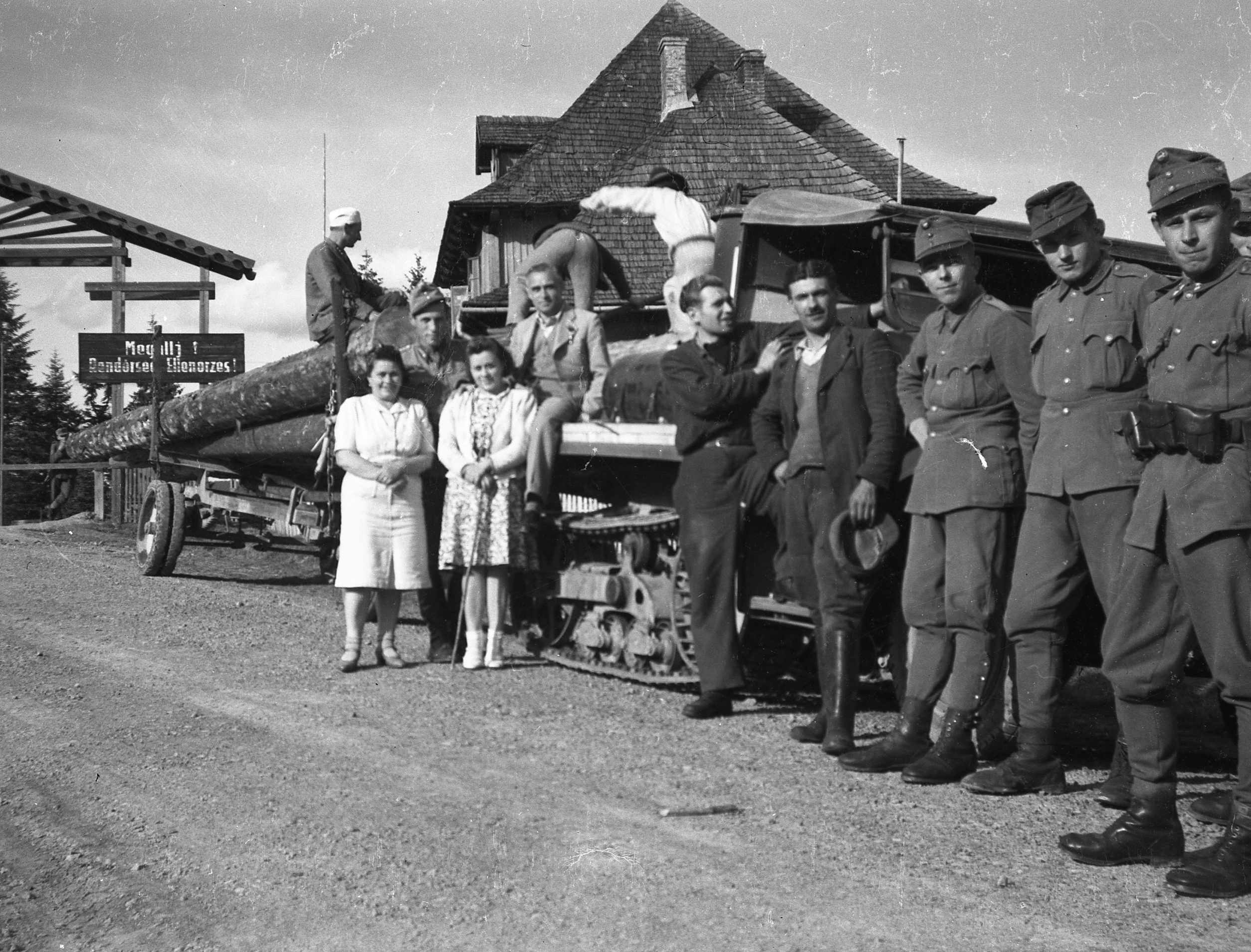
Hungarian-Soviet border at Uzhok pass, 1940

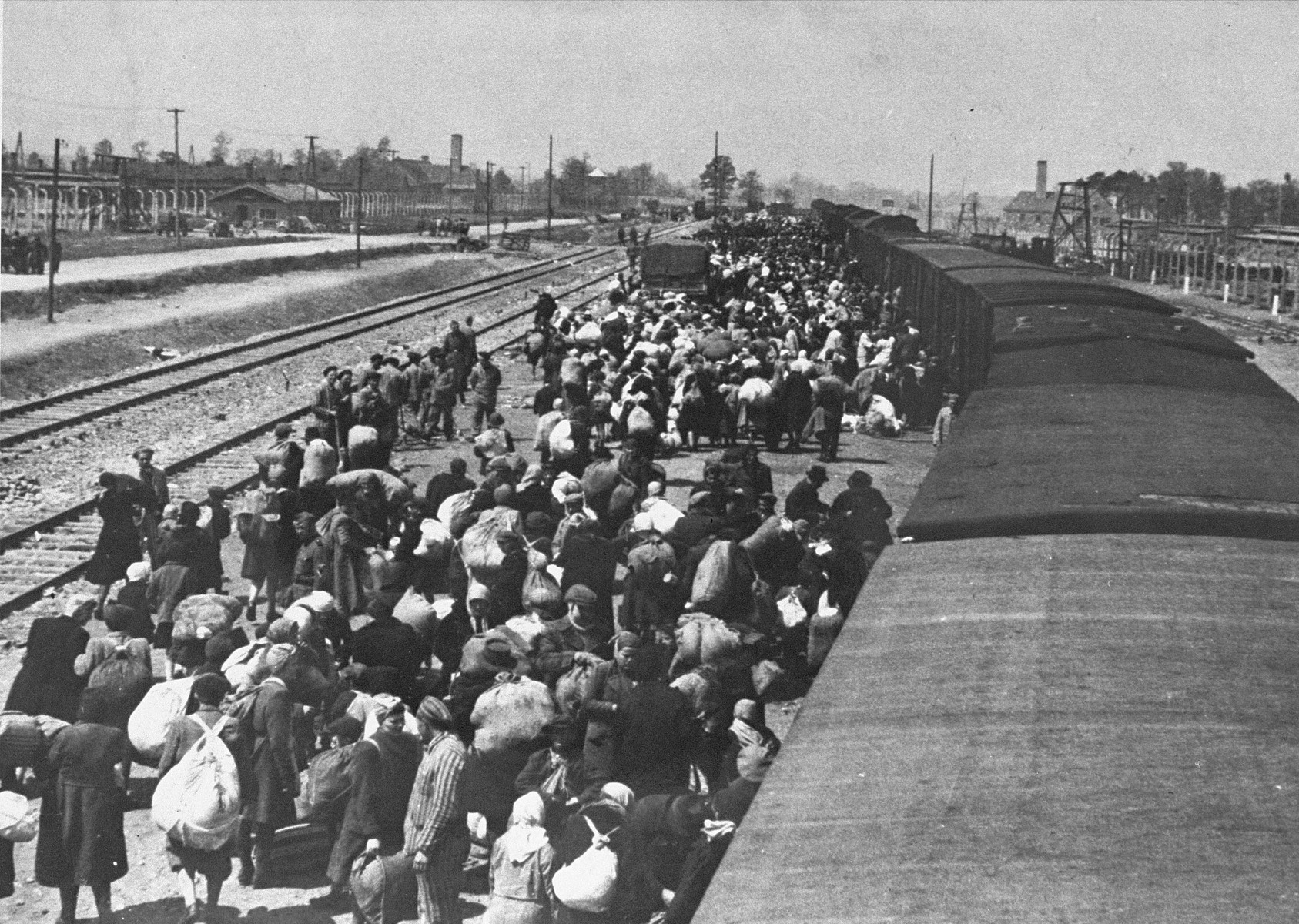
Carpathian Ruthenian Jews arrive at Auschwitz–Birkenau, May 1944. Without being registered to the camp system, most were killed in gas chambers hours after arriving.

Carpathian Ruthenia (also called Carpatho-Rus, Subcarpathian Ruthenia, and Transcarpathia) was a region in the easternmost part of Czechoslovakia which in September 1938 became an autonomous region within that country. On 15 March 1939 it declared its independence as the "Republic of Carpatho-Ukraine"; however, on that same day it was occupied and annexed by Hungary.

Beginning in October 1944, the territory was occupied by the Soviet Red Army and was briefly organized as Transcarpathian Ukraine (1944—1946), until in 1946 it was incorporated into the Ukrainian Soviet Socialist Republic.

Between 1939 and 1944, 80,000 Carpathian Ukrainians perished.

== Independence and subsequent annexation ==
In November 1938, under the First Vienna Award, which resulted from the Munich Agreement, Nazi Germany and Fascist Italy prevailed on the Second Czechoslovak Republic to cede the southern third of Slovakia and southern Carpathian Ruthenia to the Kingdom of Hungary.

Between 14 and 15 March 1939, the Slovak Republic declared its independence while Nazi Germany occupied Bohemia and Moravia creating the Protectorate of Bohemia and Moravia. On 15 March, Carpatho-Ukraine declared its independence as the Republic of Carpatho-Ukraine, with the Reverend Avhustyn Voloshyn as head of state. Hungary immediately occupied and annexed the new republic. The remnants of the Czechoslovak Army abandoned the newly-formed republic, and Carpatho-Ukraine tried to defend itself by local self-defence groups, organised by the Organization of Ukrainian Nationalists as Carpathian Sich. On 18 March, resistance to the invasion ended.

On 23 March, Hungary annexed further parts of eastern Slovakia west of Carpatho-Rus. The Hungarian invasion was followed by a few weeks of terror in which more than 27,000 people were shot dead without trial and investigation. Over 75,000 Ukrainians decided to seek asylum in the Soviet Union, almost 60,000 of whom died in gulag prison camps. The territory covered by the Governorate of Subcarpathia was divided into three, the administrative branch offices of Ung (Ungi közigazgatási kirendeltség), Bereg (Beregi közigazgatási kirendeltség) and Máramaros (Máramarosi közigazgatási kirendeltség), having Hungarian and the Rusyn language as official languages.

=== Persecution of the Jewish population ===
Beginning in 1939, the anti Jewish laws passed in Hungary were extended to the newly-annexed territories, including the rest of Carpathian Ruthenia. Then in the summer of 1941, Hungarian authorities deported about 24,000 Jews from Carpathian Ruthenia to the Galician area of the occupied Ukraine under the guise of expelling alien refugees, but in practice most of those expelled were from families that had lived in the region for the previous 50–100 years, but their legal identification was problematic because of the numerous change of status quo. Also, the laws and regulations did not help them confirm their former Hungarian citizenship. Later, most of the deportees were handed over to German Einsatzgruppen units at Kaminets Podolsk and machine-gunned over a three-day period in September 1941. A few thousand of the deportees never reached the massacre site but were instead abandoned in Galicia, in towns close to the massacre site such as Mielnitza-Podolsk (Mielnica). These deportees were forced to live in German-occupied Galicia and suffered the same fate as the Jews who were native to the area. Only a handful of these deportees survived until liberation by Soviet soldiers in summer of 1944.

Hungarian authorities conscripted Jewish men of working age into slave labor gangs in which a high proportion perished.

In March 1944, Operation Margarethe had German forces overthrow the Hungarian government and install Döme Sztójay as prime minister. In April 1944, 17 main ghettos were set up in cities in Ruthenia. 144,000 Jews were rounded up and held there. Starting on 15 May 1944, Jews were taken out of these sites to Auschwitz every day until the last deportation on 7 June 1944. By June 1944, nearly all the Jews from ghettos of Carpathian Ruthenia had been exterminated, together with other Hungarian Jews. Of more than 100,000 Jews from Carpathian Ruthenia, around 90,000 were murdered.

== Transcarpathian Ukraine ==
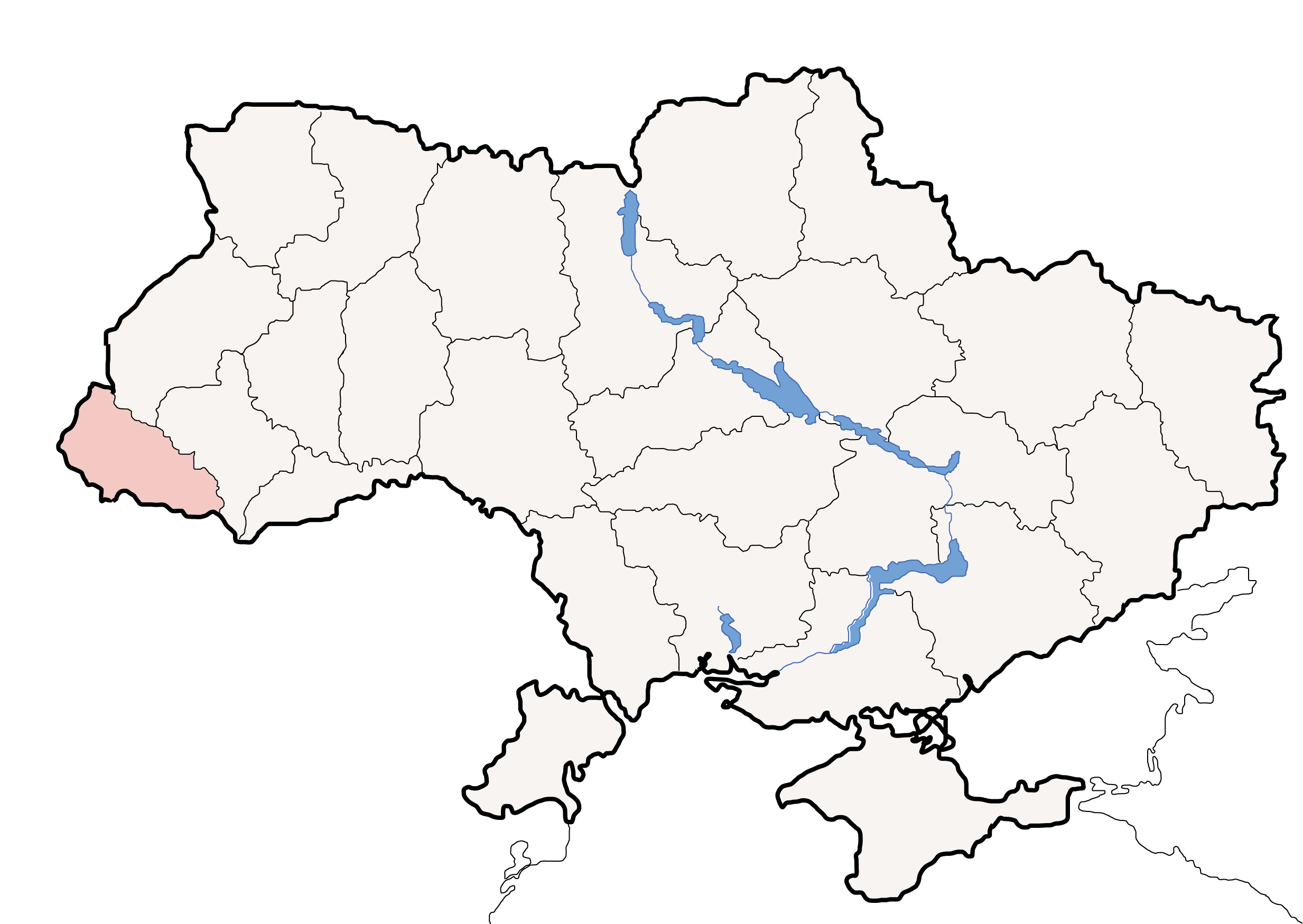
Map of the Zakarpattia Oblast of Ukraine

In October 1944, Carpathian Ruthenia was occupied by the Soviet army and the German and Hungarian military forces were expelled from the region. Merely two weeks after the entrance of the Soviet armed forces tens of thousands of Hungarian and German male civilians were deported to the death camp of Svaliava (Szolyva).

With the assistance of the Soviet military administration, the territory was temporarily organised as an independent transitional state, namely Transcarpathian Ukraine (1944—1946), and it remained as such until the territorial dispute between Czechoslovakia and the Soviet Union was settled in 1946.

=== Territorial dispute ===
A Czechoslovak delegation under František Němec was dispatched to the area which was to mobilize the liberated local population to form a Czechoslovak army and to prepare for elections in cooperation with recently established national committees. However, loyalty to a Czechoslovak state was tenuous in Carpathian Ruthenia. The Czechoslovak government-in-exile led by President Edvard Beneš issued a proclamation in April 1944 excluding from political participation former collaborationist Hungarians, Germans, and the Russophile Ruthenian followers of Andrej Brody and the Fencik Party (who had collaborated with the Hungarians). This amounted to approximately one-third of the population. Another one-third was communist, leaving one-third of the population as neutral.

Upon arrival in the territory, the Czechoslovak delegation set up headquarters in Khust and on 30 October issued a mobilization proclamation. Soviet military forces prevented both the printing and the posting of the Czechoslovak proclamation and proceeded instead to organize the local population. Protests from Beneš's government-in-exile went unheeded. Soviet activities led much of the local population to believe that Soviet annexation was imminent. The Czechoslovak delegation was also prevented from establishing a cooperative relationship with the local national committees promoted by the Soviets.

On 19 November, the communists, meeting in Mukachevo, issued a resolution requesting separation of the territory and the incorporation into the Ukrainian Soviet Socialist Republic. On 26 November the Congress of National Committees unanimously accepted the resolution of the communists. The Congress elected the National Council and instructed that a delegation be sent to Moscow to discuss union. The Czechoslovak delegation was asked to leave the area.

Negotiations between the Czechoslovak government and Moscow ensued. Both Czech and Slovak communists encouraged Beneš to resign on the territory. The Soviet Union agreed to postpone annexation until the postwar period to avoid compromising Beneš's policy based on the pre-Munich frontiers.

After World War II, in June 1945, Czechoslovakia and the Soviet Union signed a treaty ceding Carpathian-Ruthenia to the Soviets. The Czech, Slovak and Rusyn inhabitants were given the choice of Czechoslovak or Soviet citizenship. In 1946, the area became part of the Ukrainian Soviet Socialist Republic, as the Zakarpattia Oblast ('Transcarpathian Oblast').

== Impact on Hungarian population ==
The end of the war was a cataclysm for the ethnic Hungarian population of the area: 10,000 fled before the arrival of Soviet forces. Many of the remaining adult men (25,000) were deported to the Soviet Union; about 30% of them died in Soviet gulags. Deportation of the Hungarian and German adult male population started from 17 November 1944 to the Szolyva (Svalyava) concentration camp. Ethnic cleansing among Ruthenians started soon. As a result of war losses, emigration and extermination of Hungarian Jews, the Hungarian-speaking population of Carpathian Ruthenia decreased from 161,000 in 1941 (Hungarian census) to 66,000 in 1947 (Soviet census), the low 1947 number is doubtless in part a result of Hungarians' fear to declare their true nationality.

== See also ==
- Bojko
- History of the Jews in Carpathian Ruthenia
- History of Ukraine
- Lemko
- Places inhabited by Rusyns
- Rusyns
- Ruthenians
- Ruthenians and Ukrainians in Czechoslovakia (1918–1938)
- West Ukrainian People's Republic
