= Gyula Ferdinandy =

Hungarian politician (1873–1960)

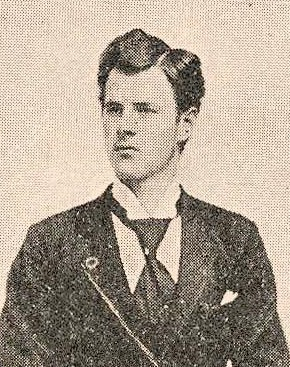

Minister of the Interior of Hungary
- In office 19 July 1920 – 19 February 1921
- Preceded by: Mihály Dömötör
- Succeeded by: Vilmos Pál Tomcsányi

Personal details
- Born: 1 June 1873; Kassa, Austria-Hungary
- Died: 16 January 1960 (aged 86); Szikszó, Hungary
- Political party: Unity Party
- Spouse: Klára Siklay
- Children: Ilona; Klára
- Profession: jurist, politician

Gyula Ferdinandy de Hidasnémeti (1 June 1873 – 16 January 1960) was a Hungarian politician, who served as Interior Minister between 1920 and 1921. During the Sándor Simonyi-Semadam's cabinet he was the Minister of Justice, following which (in the government of Pál Teleki) Ferdinandy replaced this position to the Minister of the Interior. He reformed the country's franchise system.

== Publications ==
- A vármegyék reformja (1909)
- A hadügyi közigazgatás reformja (1910)
- Az önkormányzati alkalmazottak felelőssége (1911) – awarded
- A község szociális feladatai (1916)

Political offices
Preceded by István Bárczy	Minister of Justice; 1920	Succeeded by Vilmos Pál Tomcsányi
Preceded by Mihály Dömötör	Minister of the Interior; 1920–1921	Succeeded by Vilmos Pál Tomcsányi
