= Trnávka (river) =

River in Slovakia

Coordinates: 48°17′09″N 17°38′09″E

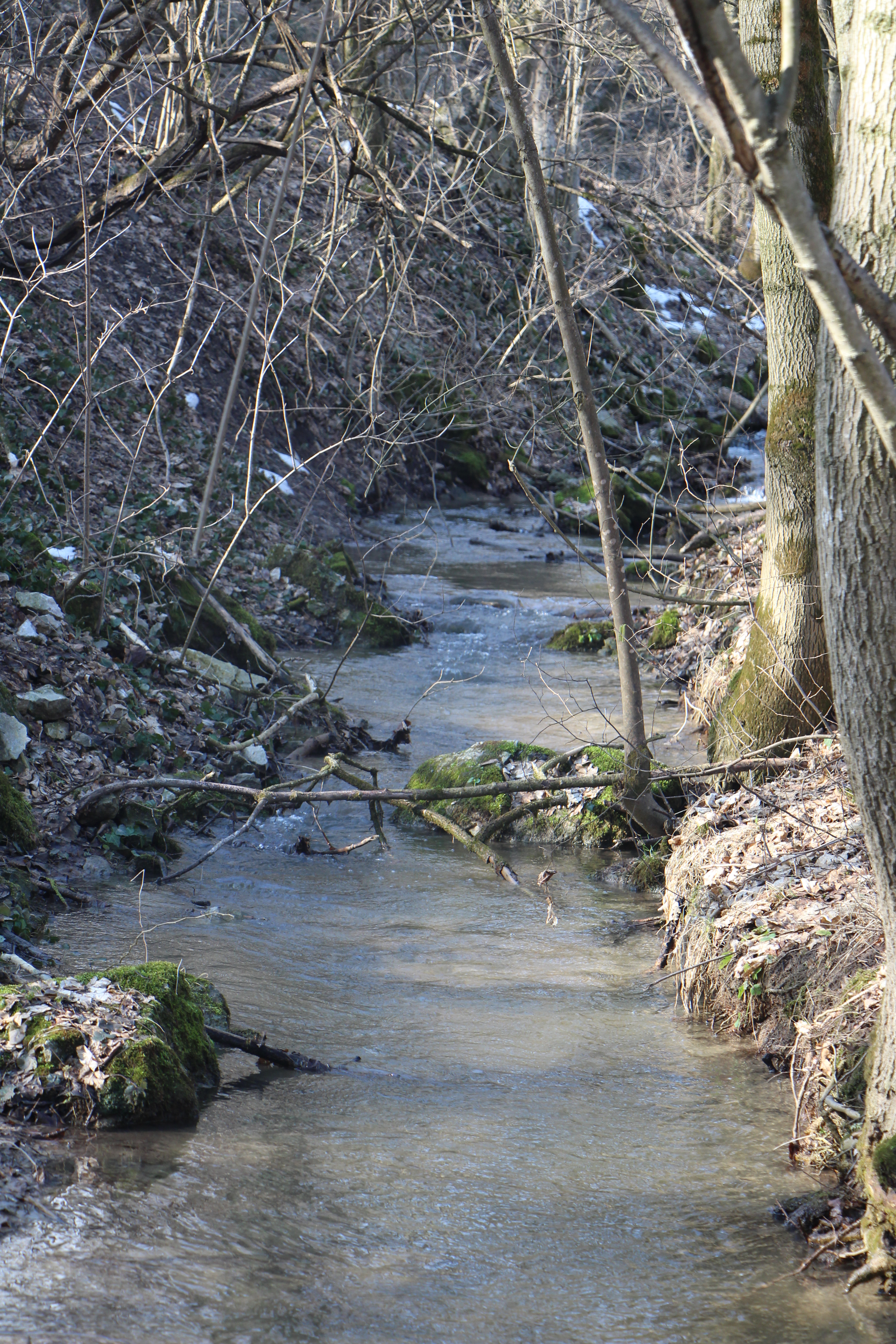
Part of the Trnávka by Buková

The Trnávka is a river in western Slovakia, a right tributary of the Dolný Dudváh. It has a length of 42 km (26 mi).

== History ==
Historically, in the 13th century, the Trnávka flowed around Trnava within the city walls and was part of its defenses. By 1727, the river was divided into two branches behind the northern city walls, meeting near the current Rose Park. Due to flood risks, notably a major flood in 1909, the city began implementing flood control measures after World War I, which continued through World War II. These efforts included converting the western branch into an underground conduit and completely undergrounding the second branch in the city center, while one branch near Rose Park was left above ground.

== Course ==
It first flows eastward in the area south of the village of Rozbehy, then turns south and flows through the cottage settlement of Sokolské chaty. At the settlement of Nespalovci, it takes on a right-hand tributary and continues southeastward. It leaves the Little Carpathians and flows into the Podunajská pahorkatina, the Trnavská pahorkatina sub-unit. It takes on Raková from the left, flows around the villages of Trstín and Bíňovce and flows into the Boleráz Reservoir. The streams Luhový potok stream (187.5 m above sea level) and Smolenický potok flow into the dam from the right. Below the dam it continues through the village of Boleráz, takes the Rakyta on the right, continues along the edge of Klčovany and significantly widens its bed. The stream continues to undulate horizontally, flows between the villages of Bohdanovce nad Trnavou (left bank) and Šelpice (right bank) and enters the territory of the city of Trnava. The city flows more or less in a north-south direction, only on the southwestern edge of the Old Town it makes a sharp double bend. It flows in a south-easterly direction along the edge of the Modranka district, but after it turns more to the south (134.7 m above sea level). It takes its most important tributary, the right-hand Parná (134.8 m above sea level) and then flows again for a short section to the south-east. Near the village of Opoj it turns south, flows as far as the village of Majcichov, near which it flows into the Dolný Dudváh.
