= Béla Szende =

Hungarian politician

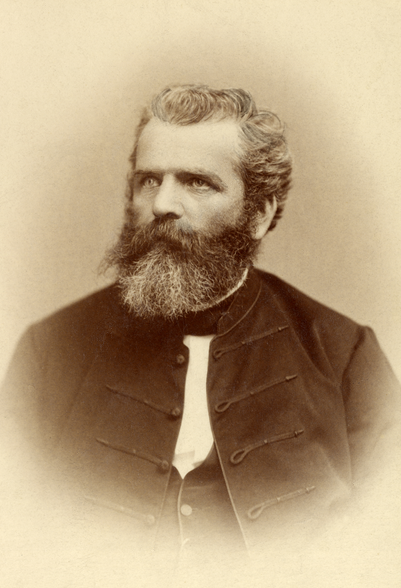

Minister of Defence of Hungary
- In office 15 December 1872 – 18 August 1882
- Preceded by: József Szlávy
- Succeeded by: Gedeon Ráday

Personal details
- Born: 4 April 1823 Lugos, Kingdom of Hungary, Austrian Empire
- Died: 18 August 1882 (aged 59) Gavosdia, Austria-Hungary
- Party: Deák Party, Liberal Party
- Profession: politician

Béla Szende de Keresztes (born as Béla Frummer on 4 April 1823, Lugos (today Lugoj, Romania) – 18 August 1882) was a Hungarian politician, who served as Minister of Defence from 15 December 1872 until his death.

As a soldier he took part in the Hungarian Revolution of 1848. After the defeat of the revolution he dealt with farming on his possession of Gavosdia (today Gavojdia, Romania).

After the Austro-Hungarian Compromise of 1867 he worked for the Ministry of Defence as an advisor. József Szlávy appointed him as Minister of Defence, that position Szende kept until the end of his life.

Political offices
| Preceded by József Szlávy | Minister of Defence; 1872–1882 | Succeeded by Gedeon Ráday |
