= Miklós Kozma =

Hungarian politician (1884–1941)

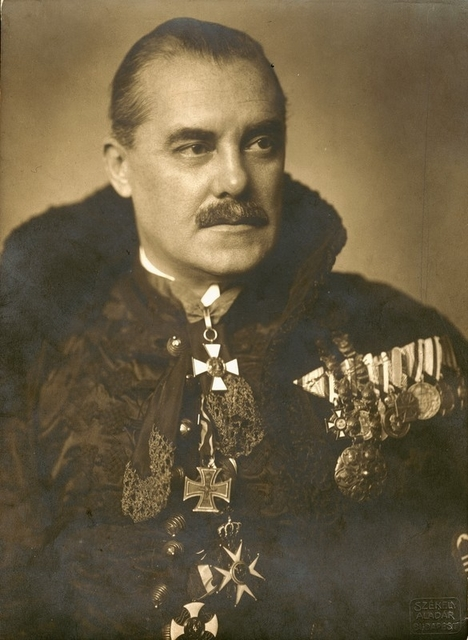

Minister of the Interior of Hungary
- In office 4 March 1935 – 3 February 1937
- Preceded by: Ferenc Keresztes-Fischer
- Succeeded by: Kálmán Darányi

Regent's Commissioner of the Governorate of Subcarpathia
- In office 12 September 1940 – 8 December 1941
- Preceded by: Zsigmond Perényi
- Succeeded by: Vilmos Pál Tomcsányi

Personal details
- Born: 5 September 1884 Nagyvárad, Hungary, Austria-Hungary
- Died: 8 December 1941 (aged 57) Ungvár, Kingdom of Hungary
- Party: Party of National Unity, Party of Hungarian Life
- Profession: politician

Vitéz Miklós Kozma de Leveld (5 September 1884 – 8 December 1941) was a Hungarian politician, who served as Interior Minister between 1935 and 1937. He was also Minister of Defence for a short time in the cabinet of Gyula Gömbös. He attended the Ludovika Academy and fought in World War I. He was the supporter of Miklós Horthy from the begins (Counter revolutionary-government of Szeged). He worked as head of the Magyar Távirati Iroda (MTI) from 1922 until his death. He did not agree with the Prime Minister Kálmán Darányi's moderate policy, so he resigned the position of the Minister of the Interior.

After the ministership Kozma continued his radical politics, he wanted to attack Carpathian Ruthenia (Kárpátalja) with the Rongyos Gárda at which time it was part of Czechoslovakia, but the government talked him out of this plan. The Rongyos Gárda had encountered the Slovak army after they filtered into the region. After the occupation Miklós Kozma was appointed as governor of Kárpátalja. He played a major role in the starting of the first Jewish deportation in Hungary, beginning with non-Hungarian Jews, including those who had escaped from surrounding countries into Hungary. Many of these deportees soon became victims of the Kamianets-Podilskyi Massacre.

Political offices
Preceded by Ferenc Keresztes-Fischer	Minister of the Interior; 1935–1937	Succeeded by Kálmán Darányi
Preceded by Gyula Gömbös	Minister of Defence; Acting; 1936	Succeeded by József Somkuthy
Preceded by Zsigmond Perényi	Regent's Commissioner of Subcarpathia; 1940–1941	Succeeded by Vilmos Pál Tomcsányi
