= Lueta =

Lueta Lövéte
- Commune
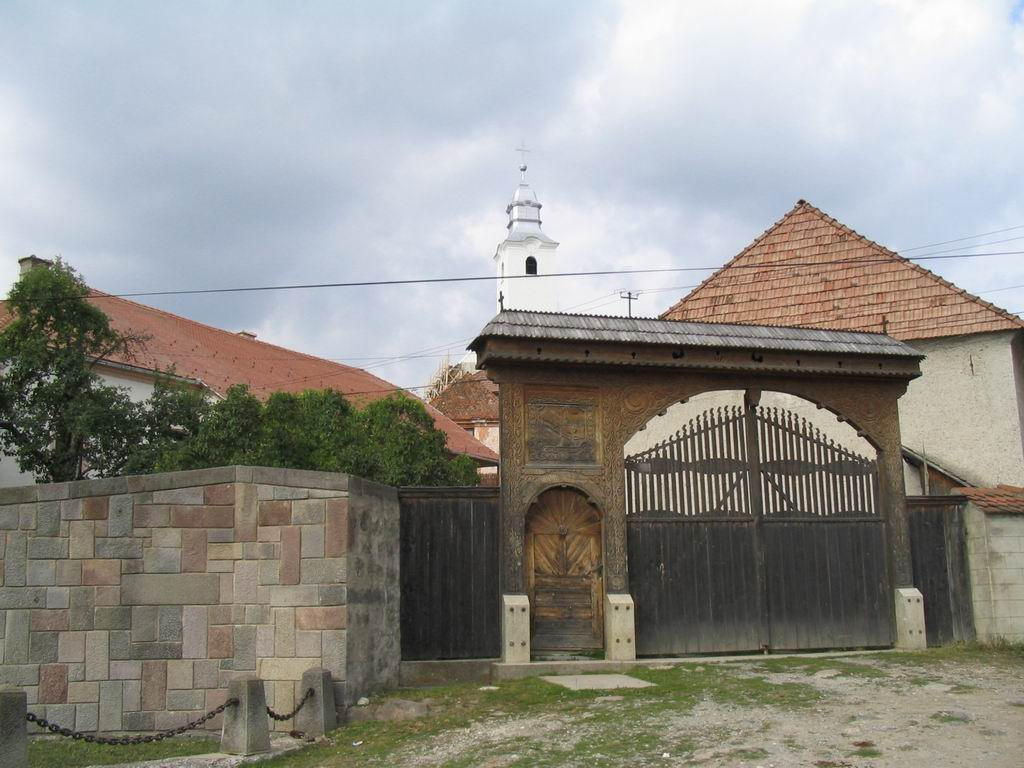
- Székely Gate

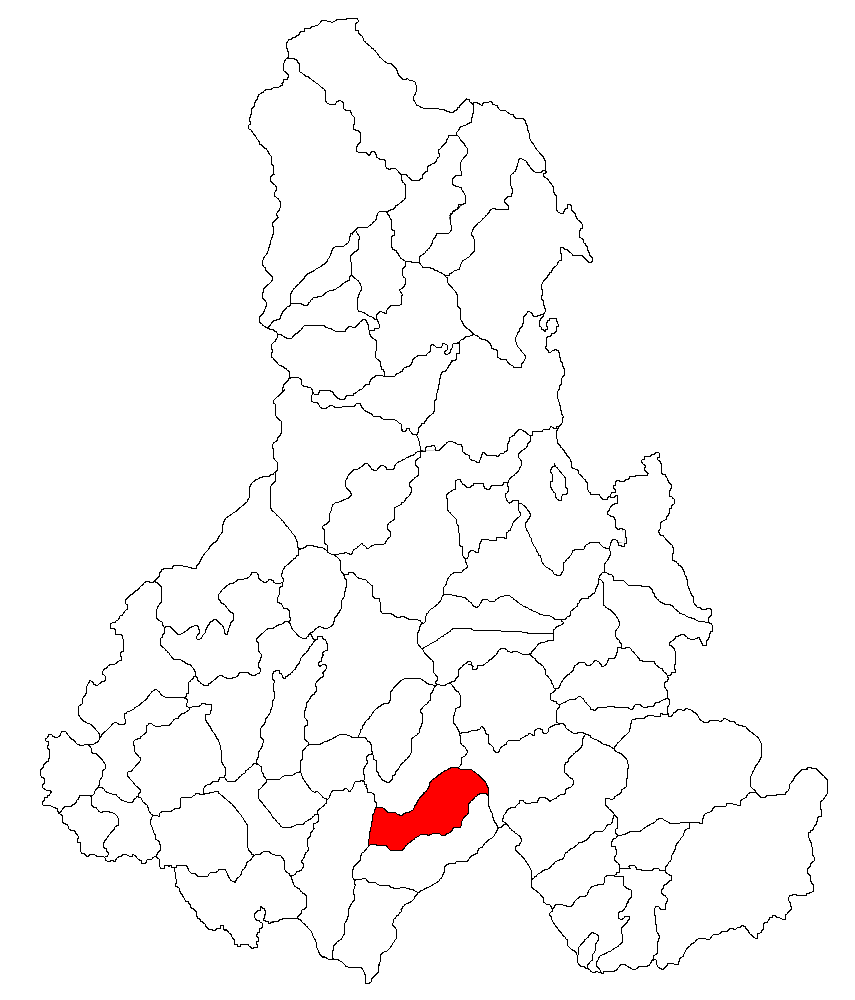
- Location in Harghita County

- Location in Romania
- Coordinates: 46°16′0″N 25°29′0″E
- Country: Romania
- County: Harghita

Government
  - Mayor (2020–2024): Dénes Mihály (UDMR)
- Area: 101.64 km^{2} (39.24 sq mi)
- Population (2021-12-01): 3,338
  - Density: 32.84/km^{2} (85.06/sq mi)
- Time zone: UTC+02:00 (EET)
  - Summer (DST): UTC+03:00 (EEST)
- Postal code: 537140
- Area code: +40 266
- Vehicle reg.: HR
- Website: www.lovete.ro

Lueta (Hungarian: Lövéte, Hungarian pronunciation: [ˈløveːtɛ]) is a commune in Harghita County, Romania. It lies in the Székely Land, an ethno-cultural region in eastern Transylvania, and is composed of two villages:

- Băile Chirui / Kirulyfürdő
- Lueta / Lövéte

== History ==
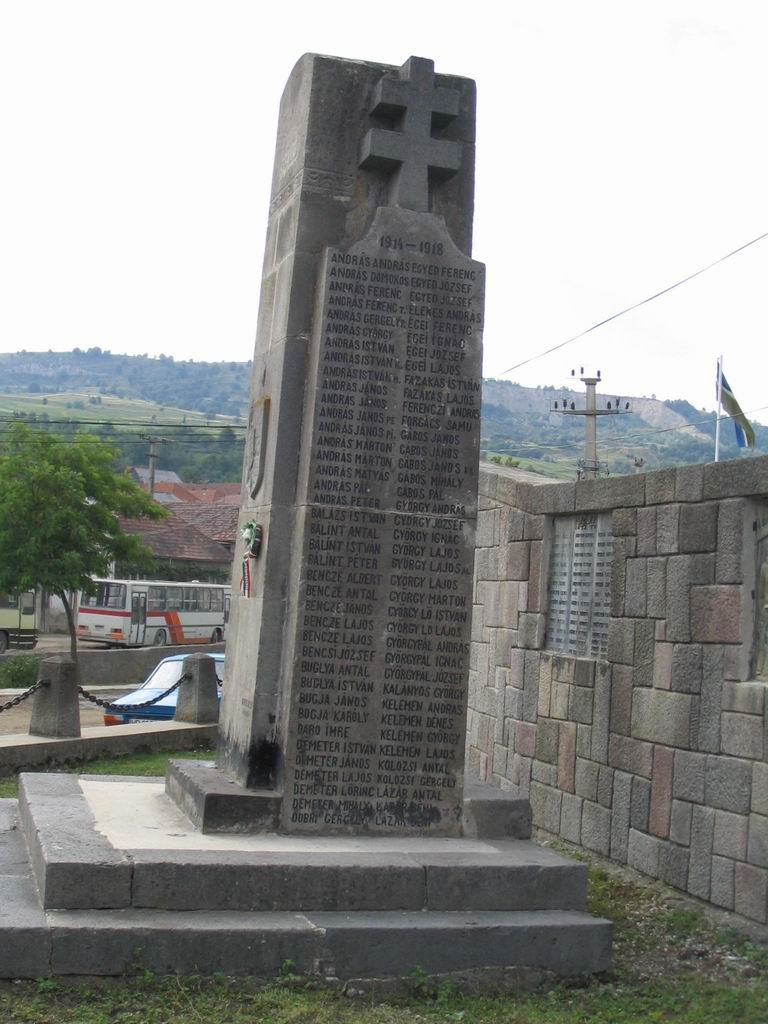
World War I Heroes' Memorial

The name of the commune was first recorded in 1332 when its priest was mentioned as "sacerdos de Lueche". In 1567, it was mentioned as Leöwete. The name derives from the ancient form of the Hungarian name Levente worn by several members of the Árpád dynasty.

The villages belonged to Udvarhelyszék district until the administrative reform of Transylvania in 1876, when they fell within the Udvarhely County in the Kingdom of Hungary. In the aftermath of World War I and the Hungarian–Romanian War of 1918–1919, the village passed under Romanian administration; after the Treaty of Trianon of 1920, like the rest of Transylvania, it became part of the Kingdom of Romania. During the interwar period it fell within Odorhei County. In 1940, the Second Vienna Award granted Northern Transylvania to Hungary and the village was held by Hungary until 1944. After Soviet occupation, the Romanian administration returned and the village became officially part of Romania in March 1945. Between 1952 and 1960, the commune fell within the Magyar Autonomous Region, between 1960 and 1968 the Mureș-Magyar Autonomous Region. In 1968, the region was abolished, and since then, the commune has been part of Harghita County.

== Demographics ==
The commune has an absolute Székely (Hungarian) majority. According to the 2011 census it had a population of 3,383; of which 99.76% or 3,375 were Hungarian.

According to the 2021 census the village has 3338 inhabitants, of which at least 3201 are Hungarian.

== Twinning ==
The villages are twinned with:

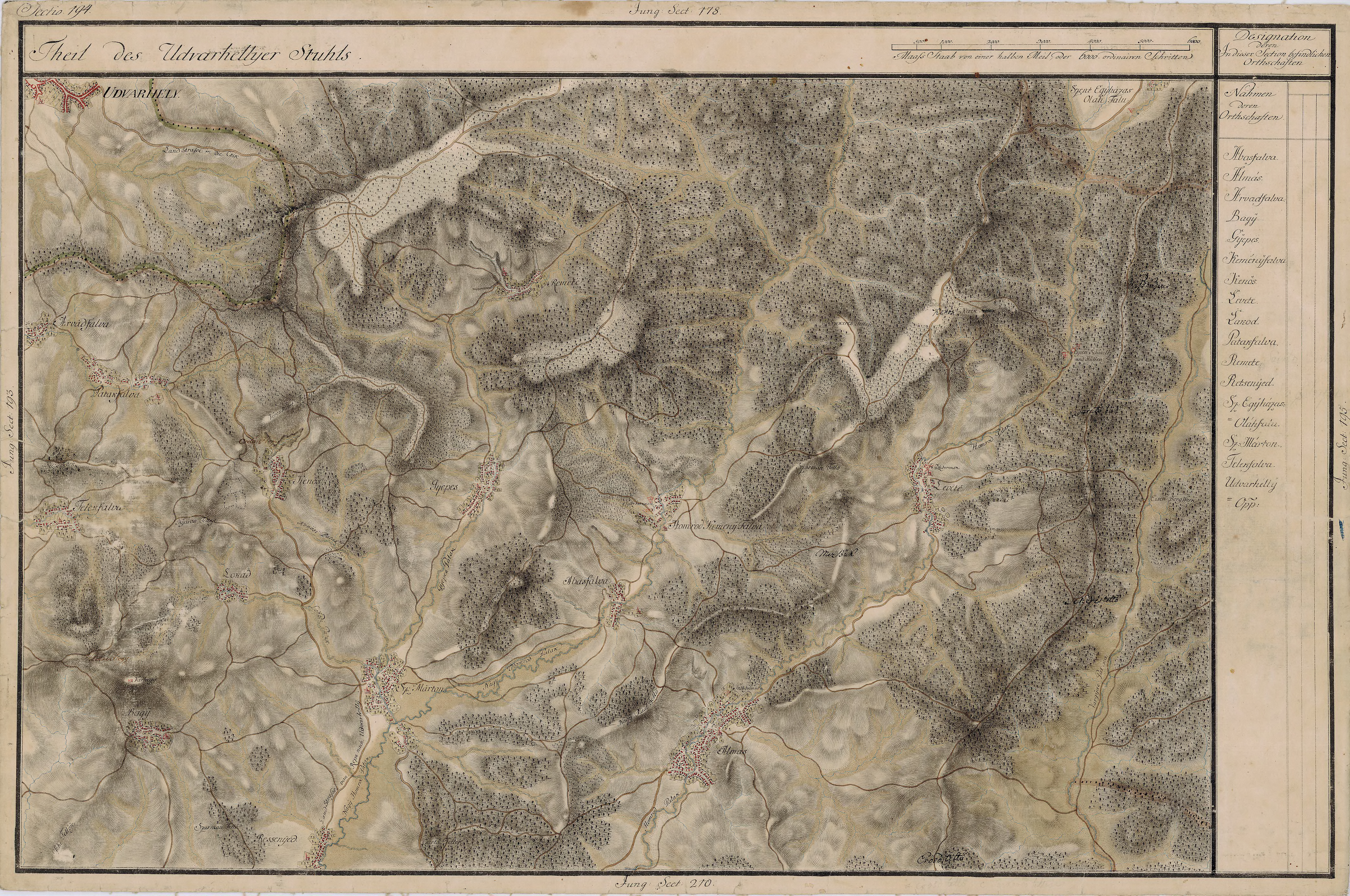
As "Levete" in an 18th-century map

- Domaszék, Hungary
- Maglód, Hungary
- Budakalász, Hungary

== Natives ==
- Márton Balázs (1929–2016)
- Albert György
