= List of princes of Austria-Hungary =

This page lists princely families in the territories of the Austro-Hungarian Empire, whether extant or extinct. The style of address was Durchlaucht (Serene Highness); also used was Fürstliche Gnaden (Princely Grace). The Austrian princely title (Fürst) was the most prestigious title of the Austrian nobility, forming the higher nobility (hoher Adel) alongside the counts (Grafen). This close inner circle, called the 100 Familien (100 families), possessed enormous riches and lands. They also had great influence at the court and thus played an important role in politics and diplomacy.

Preposition (Note: Where this section is blank, it is possible that the preposition is unknown or did not exist.)	Original name	Most called	Notes
von	Auersperg	Auersperg	head of this family also carries the titles of Duke of Gottschee, Princely Count of Wels. All members of the princely line are Serene Highnesses, Princes(ses) of Auersperg. Also several comital lines.
	Batthyány-Strattmann		junior members were counts
von	Clary und Aldringen	Clary-Aldringen	junior members were counts
von	Collalto und San Salvatore	Collalto	junior members were counts
von	Colloredo-Mansfeld	Colloredo-Mansfeld	junior members were counts; eldest son of the prince was titled Count of Mansfeld; see also House of Mansfeld
von	Croÿ	Croÿ-(subline)	also known as Croÿ-Dülmen, three branches exist. Heads of this family were dukes; also used the preposition de.
von	Dietrichstein		became extinct firstly in male line, recreated for husband of heiress; junior members of this family were counts of Dietrichstein & Proskau-Leslie (first family) then Dietrichstein-Mensdorff-Pouilly (second family)
von	Eggenberg		became extinct firstly in male line, Bohemian possessions passed to the nearest male relatives via marriage, the Schwarzenberg family, and Styrian possessions likewise to the Herberstein family.
	Esterházy von Galántha	Esterházy	also comital; also used the preposition de
	Festetics von Tolna	Festetics	also comital; also used the preposition de
zu	Fürstenberg	Fürstenberg	members use titles outside of Austria; some use the preposition von
von	Grassalkovics	Grassalkovics	became extinct
von	Hohenberg	Hohenberg	title of Fürst for all members (see here); elevated to ducal status by primogeniture in 1917; the head of this house is titled Herzog von Hohenberg (Duke of Hohenberg)
zu	Hohenlohe	Hohenlohe-(subline)	this family had multiple branches
von	Khevenhüller-Metsch	Khevenhüller-Metsch	junior members were counts
	Kinsky von Wchinitz und Tettau	Kinsky	junior members were counts; also comital
von	Koháry	Saxe-Coburg-Gotha-Koháry	also comital; became extinct firstly in male line, possessions passed to the Saxe-Coburg and Gotha branch of the family via marriage to the heiress of the last prince
von	Lichnowsky	Lichnowsky	
von	Lobkowicz	Lobkowicz	
	Lónyay de Nagy-Lónya et Vásáros-Namény	Lónyay	also comital; also used the preposition de
von und zu	Liechtenstein	Liechtenstein	sovereign since 1719
von	Metternich-Winneburg	Metternich	also used the preposition de
von	Montenuovo	Montenuovo	see also House of Neipperg
zu	Oettingen-Oettingen		this family had multiple branches (Oettingen, Wallerstein & Spielberg)
von	Orsini und Rosenberg	Orsini-Rosenberg	junior members were counts
von	Paar	Paar auf Hartberg und Krottenstein	junior members were counts
von	Porcia	Porcia	junior members were counts
von	Rohan	Rohan	a line of this family was ducal; also used the preposition de
zu	Sayn-Wittgenstein	Sayn-Wittgenstein-(subline)	this family had multiple branches
von	Schönburg	Schönburg-(subline)	this family had multiple branches (Hartenstein & Waldenburg); also comital
von	Starhemberg	Starhemberg	junior members were counts
zu	Schwarzenberg	Schwarzenberg	the head of this house is also Duke of Krumlov, Princely Landgrave in Klettgau, and Count of Sulz
von	Thun-Hohenstein	Thun-Hohenstein	also comital
von und zu	Trauttmansdorff-Weinsberg	Trauttmansdorff-Weinsberg	also comital
von	Waldburg	Waldburg-(subline)	this family had multiple branches; junior members were counts
von	Weikersheim	Hohenlohe-Langenburg-(morganatic branch)	junior members were counts
zu	Windisch-Graetz	Windisch-Graetz	also Windisch-Grätz
