= Domaszék =

- Village
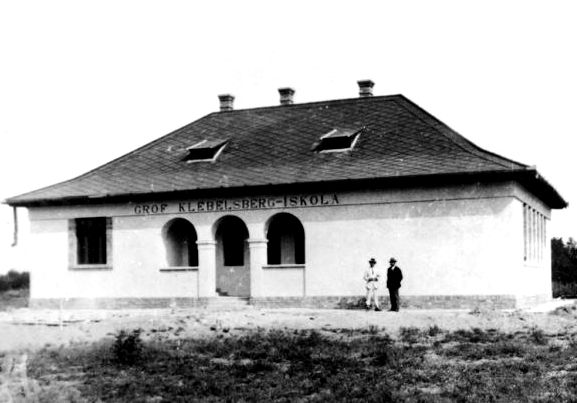
- The Count Klebelsberg school in the 1920s

- Coat of arms

- Location of Domaszék
- Coordinates: 46.25°N 20.01°E
- Country: Hungary
- County: Csongrád

Area
  - Total: 52.15 km^{2} (20.14 sq mi)

Population (2015)
  - Total: 4,919
  - Density: 93.69/km^{2} (242.7/sq mi)
- Time zone: UTC+1 (CET)
  - Summer (DST): UTC+2 (CEST)
- Postal code: 6781
- Area code: 62

Domaszék is a village in Csongrád county, in the Southern Great Plain region of southern Hungary.

== Geography ==
It lies 12 km west from the city of Szeged in the Southern Great Plain. It is bordered by the Székestói Canal to the east and north.

== Twin towns – sister cities ==
Domaszék is twinned with:

- Bački Vinogradi (Subotica), Serbia
- Lueta, Romania
- Wolbrom, Poland
