= Vilmos Pál Tomcsányi =

Hungarian politician (1880–1959)

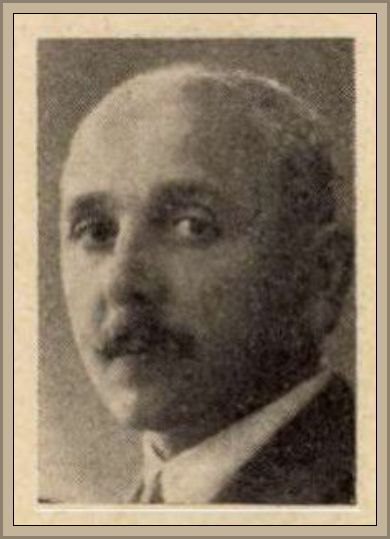

Minister of Justice of Hungary
- In office 19 July 1920 – 16 June 1922
- Preceded by: Gyula Ferdinandy
- Succeeded by: Géza Daruváry

Minister of the Interior of Hungary
- In office 19 February 1921 – 14 April 1921
- Preceded by: Gyula Ferdinandy
- Succeeded by: Gedeon Ráday

Regent's Commissioner of the Governorate of Subcarpathia
- In office 5 January 1942 – 10 May 1944
- Preceded by: Miklós Kozma
- Succeeded by: András Vincze

Personal details
- Born: February 8, 1880; Budapest, Austria-Hungary
- Died: 7 May 1959 (aged 79); Budapest, Hungarian People's Republic
- Political party: Smallholders' Party
- Profession: jurist, politician

Vilmos Pál Tomcsányi (8 February 1880 in Budapest – 7 May 1959) was a Hungarian politician, who served as Interior Minister in 1921. He was the governor of the Governorate of Subcarpathia (Kárpátaljai Kormányzóság) between 1942 and 1944. In May 1944, it was reported that Tomcsányi was arrested and sent to a concentration camp by the authorities for protesting the anti-Jewish measures and legislation taken by the Nazi-collaborating government.

Political offices
Preceded by Gyula Ferdinandy	Minister of Justice; 1920–1922	Succeeded by Géza Daruváry
Preceded by Gyula Ferdinandy	Minister of the Interior; 1921	Succeeded by Gedeon Ráday
Preceded by Miklós Kozma	Regent's Commissioner of Subcarpathia; 1942–1944	Succeeded by András Vincze
