= Renoldi =

Noble family

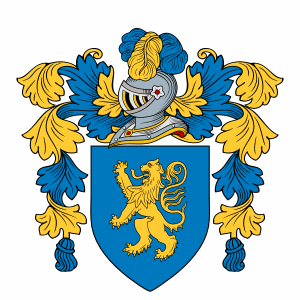
The Family Crest of the Von Renoldi-Staud

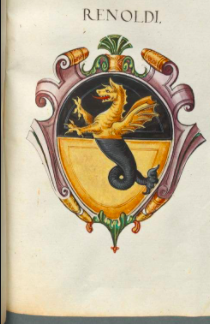
The Coat of Arms of the family.

The House of Renoldi is a noble family, historically of probable Hungarian or Frankish provenance. In the earliest period the Italian branch of the family established in Italy around the eleventh century, after serving as crusader knights in several crusades they settled down in Venice. In 1273 the family came to a dominant role in the political scenario of Venice with Giovanni who was the head of the Sestiere of Santa Croce until his death. The family remained as an influential entity in the republic of Venice and as a strong connection with the House of Habsburg.

The family is composed of three main branches: The German-Swedish in its variation of Reinhold, The Italian in the form Renoldi and The Austro-Hungarian as Von Renoldi-Staud. The family retains the title of Count in Austro-Hungarian Empire and later in the Hungarian Monarchy until 1946.

During the Second World War, Dr. Otto von Renoldi was surgeon chief of the sixth German army Wehrmacht and signed the agreement of cease fire with the Russian army.
