= Ráday =

Ráday is a Hungarian surname. Notable people with the surname include:

- Gedeon Ráday (disambiguation), multiple people
- Imre Ráday (1905–1983), Hungarian actor
