= Hartig =

Hartig is a German surname. Notable people with the surname include:

- Hartig Drug, a chain of pharmacy retail stores based out of Dubuque, Iowa
- Friedrich Hartig (1900–1980), Italian entomologist who specialised in Lepidoptera
- Georg Ludwig Hartig (1764–1837), German agriculturist and writer on forestry
- Heinz Friedrich Hartig (1907–1969), German composer and harpsichordist
- Iulian Hartig (born 1998), Romanian rugby union player
- Lukáš Hartig (born 1976), Czech football player
- Robert Hartig (1839–1901), German forestry scientist and mycologist, son of Theodor
- Theodor Hartig (1805–1880), German forestry scientist and zoologist, son of Georg Ludwig

== See also ==
- Austrian nobility
- List of counts of Austria-Hungary
