= Grünne =

Grünne (sometimes transliterated as Gruenne) is a German surname, associated with the Wallonian noble Grünne family.

- Charles François Prosper de Hemricourt de Grünne (1875–1937)
- Karl Ludwig von Grünne
- Mathias Charles Thomas Marie de Hemricourt de Grunne (1769–1853)
- Philipp Ferdinand von Grünne
