= Trnávka (Pardubice District) =

- Municipality
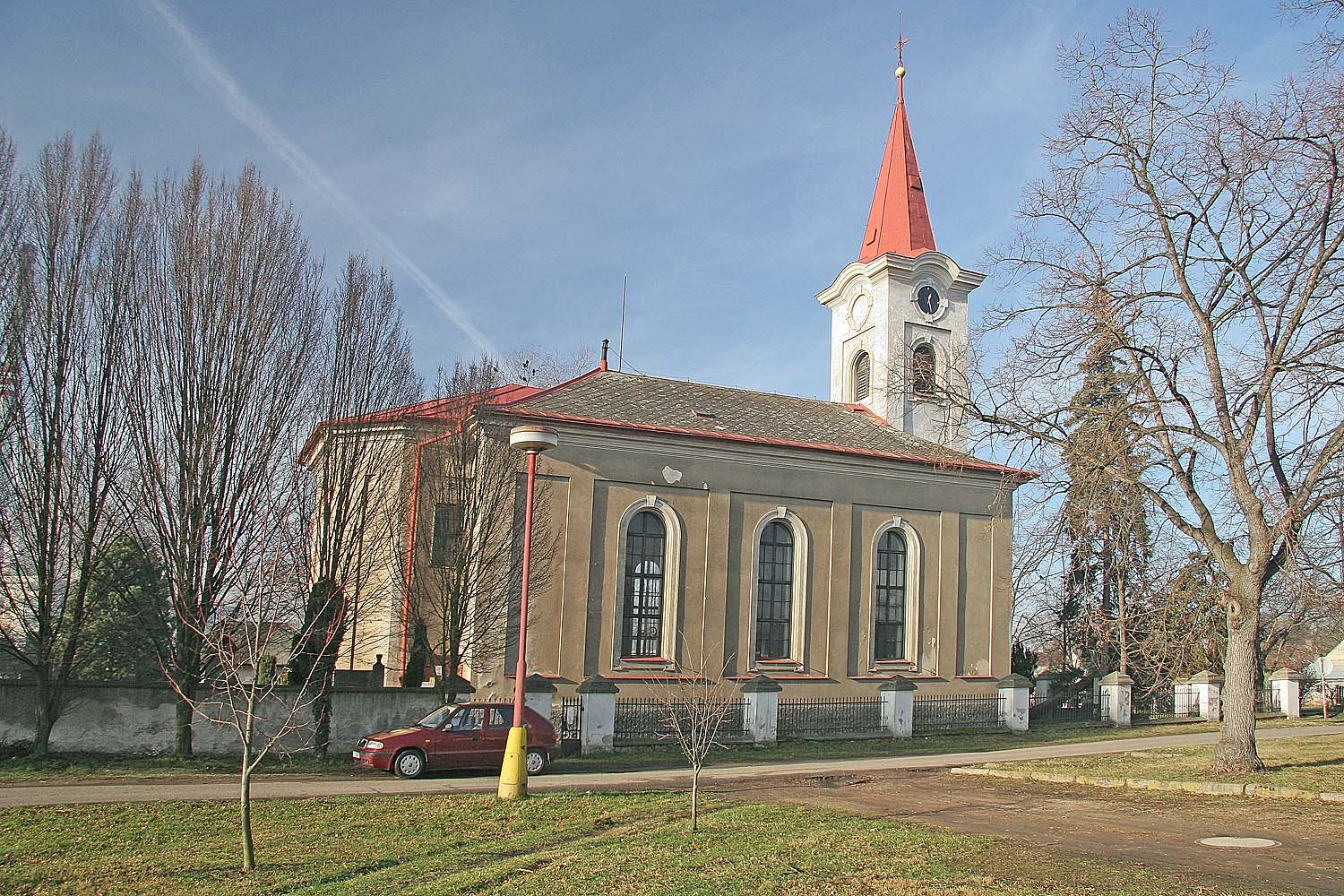
- Evangelical church

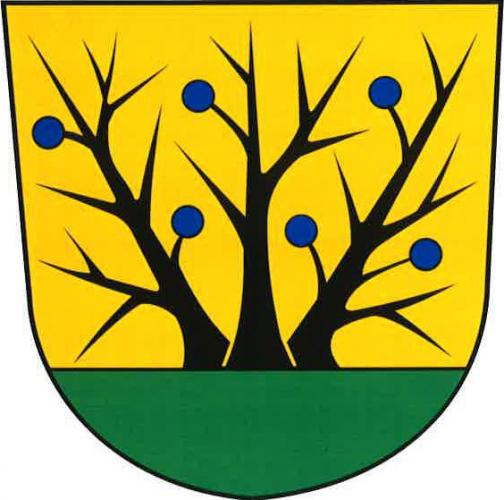
- Coat of arms

- Location in the Czech Republic
- Coordinates: 50°1′58″N 15°27′40″E
- Country: Czech Republic
- Region: Pardubice
- District: Pardubice
- First mentioned: 1333

Area
  - Total: 3.63 km^{2} (1.40 sq mi)
- Elevation: 204 m (669 ft)

Population (2026-01-01)
  - Total: 209
  - Density: 57.6/km^{2} (149/sq mi)
- Time zone: UTC+1 (CET)
  - Summer (DST): UTC+2 (CEST)
- Postal code: 535 01
- Website: www.trnavka-obec.cz

Trnávka is a municipality and village in Pardubice District in the Pardubice Region of the Czech Republic. It has about 200 inhabitants.

== Demographics ==
Historical population
Year	Pop.	±%
1869	437	—
1880	428	−2.1%
1890	418	−2.3%
1900	450	+7.7%
1910	464	+3.1%
1921	431	−7.1%
1930	456	+5.8%
1950	455	−0.2%
1961	387	−14.9%
1970	323	−16.5%
1980	265	−18.0%
1991	207	−21.9%
2001	208	+0.5%
2011	215	+3.4%
2021	209	−2.8%
Source: Censuses
