= Tige =

Tige is a masculine given name and nickname which may refer to:

People:

- Tige Andrews (1920-2007), American actor
- Tige Reynolds (1877–1931), American cartoonist
- Tige Rodgers, co-host of the Tige and Daniel Show American radio program
- Tige Savage (born 1968), American investor and co-founder and managing partner of Revolution LLC, an investment firm
- Tige Simmons (born 1977), Australian wheelchair basketball player
- Tige Stone (1901-1960), American baseball player

Fictional characters:

- Tige, comic strip character Buster Brown's dog
