= Somssich =

Somssich is a surname. Notable people with the surname include:

- József Somssich (1864–1941), Hungarian politician
- Pál Somssich (1811–1888), Hungarian politician
- Peter Somssich, American politician

== See also ==
- Semikhah
