= Gedeon Ráday (writer) =

Hungarian poet and translator (1713–1792)

Count Gedeon Ráday de Ráda (1 October 1713 – 6 August 1792) was a Hungarian poet, translator and nobleman.

He came from the Ráday family, and was the son of Pál Ráday, the chancellor of Francis II Rákóczi. He received an excellent education, completed by a trip in 1730 during which he visited several German universities. In 1733, he returned to his homeland and, as his father's only son, took over the management of the family estates. There he devoted himself to poetry, literary scholarship and translation. He was the first to revive the interest of the Hungarian reading world in the Zrinyad, an epic poem about the fall of Szigeth and the heroic death of Nikola IV Zrinski.
