= Pécel =

- Town
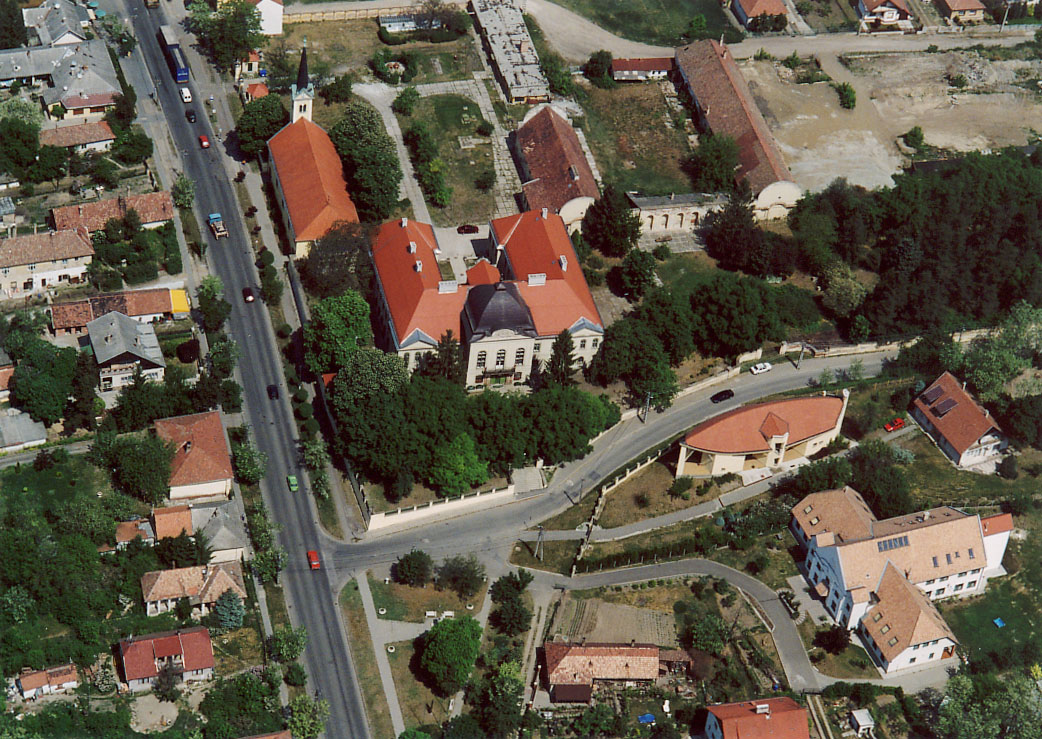
- Ráday palace, Pécel

- Flag Coat of arms

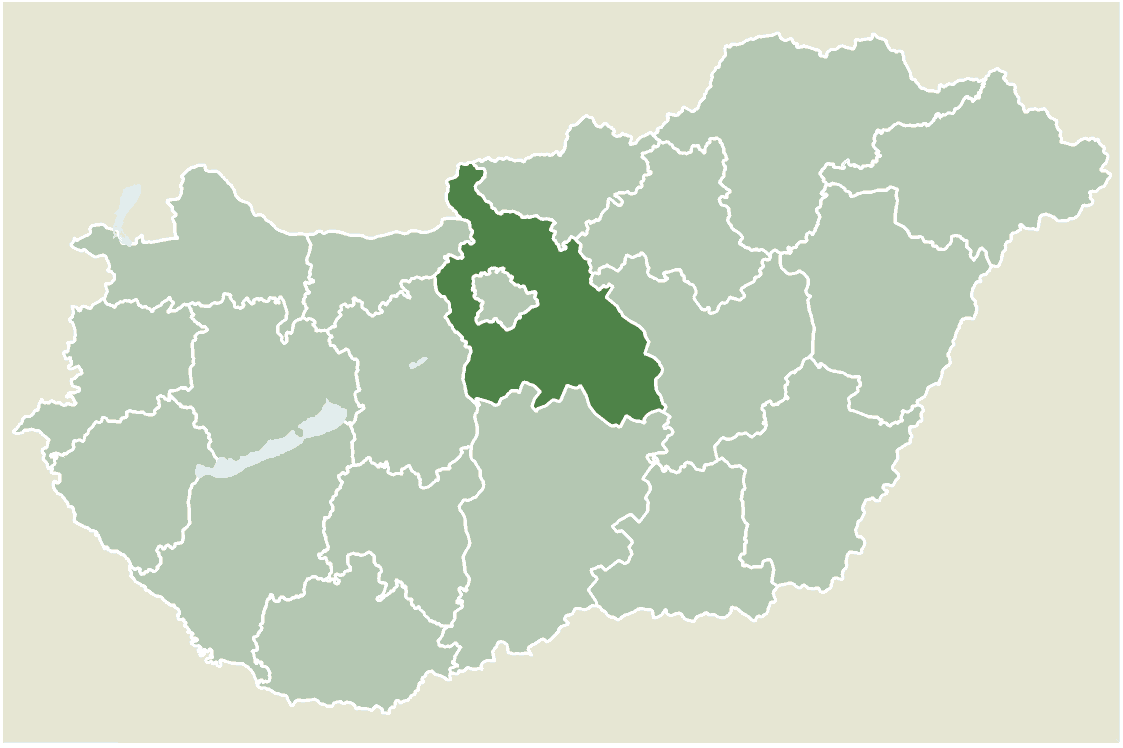
- Location of Pest county in Hungary

- Location of Pécel
- Coordinates: 47.4893°N 19.33542°E
- Country: Hungary
- County: Pest

Area
  - Total: 43.63 km^{2} (16.85 sq mi)

Population (2007)
  - Total: 14,328
  - Density: 328.4/km^{2} (850.5/sq mi)
- Time zone: UTC+1 (CET)
  - Summer (DST): UTC+2 (CEST)
- Postal code: 2119
- Area code: 28

Pécel is a town in Pest county, Budapest metropolitan area, Hungary. It is situated outside Budapest's 17th district a little over 20 kilometres (12 miles) from Budapest city centre.

== Notable people ==
- Gedeon Ráday, soldier and politician, Minister of Defence
- István Sárközi, footballer

== Twin towns – sister cities ==
Pécel is twinned with:

- Mistelbach, Austria
- Iisalmi, Finland

== Gallery ==
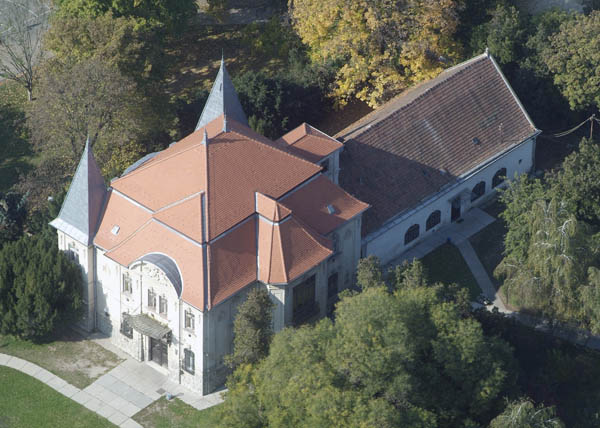

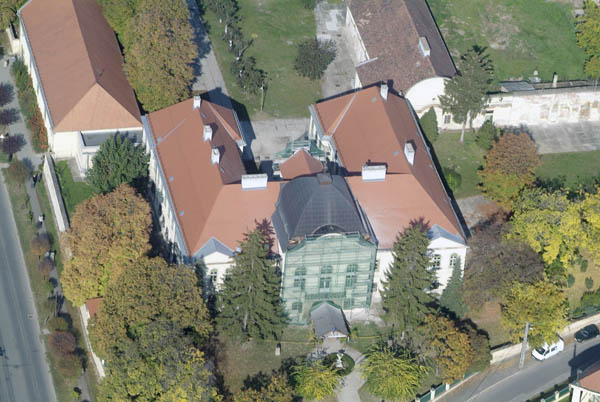

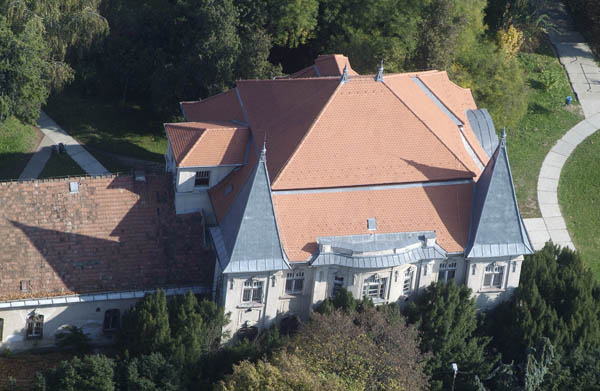

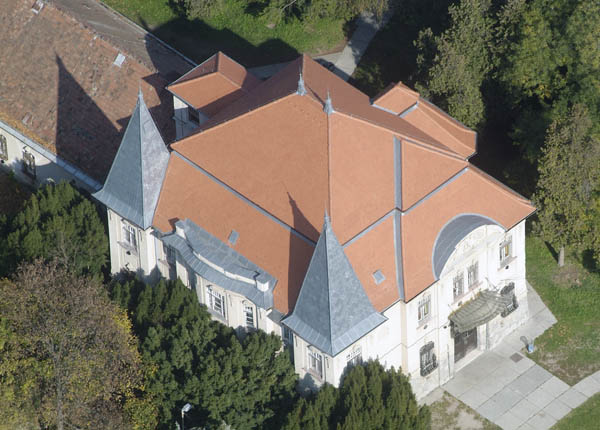
