= Zenz =

Zenz is a surname of German origin. People with that name include:

- Adrian Zenz, German anthropologist
- Therese Zenz, German sprint canoer

== See also ==
- Zens, a former municipality in the district of Salzlandkreis, in Saxony-Anhalt, Germany
