= Alatia Marton =

American actress

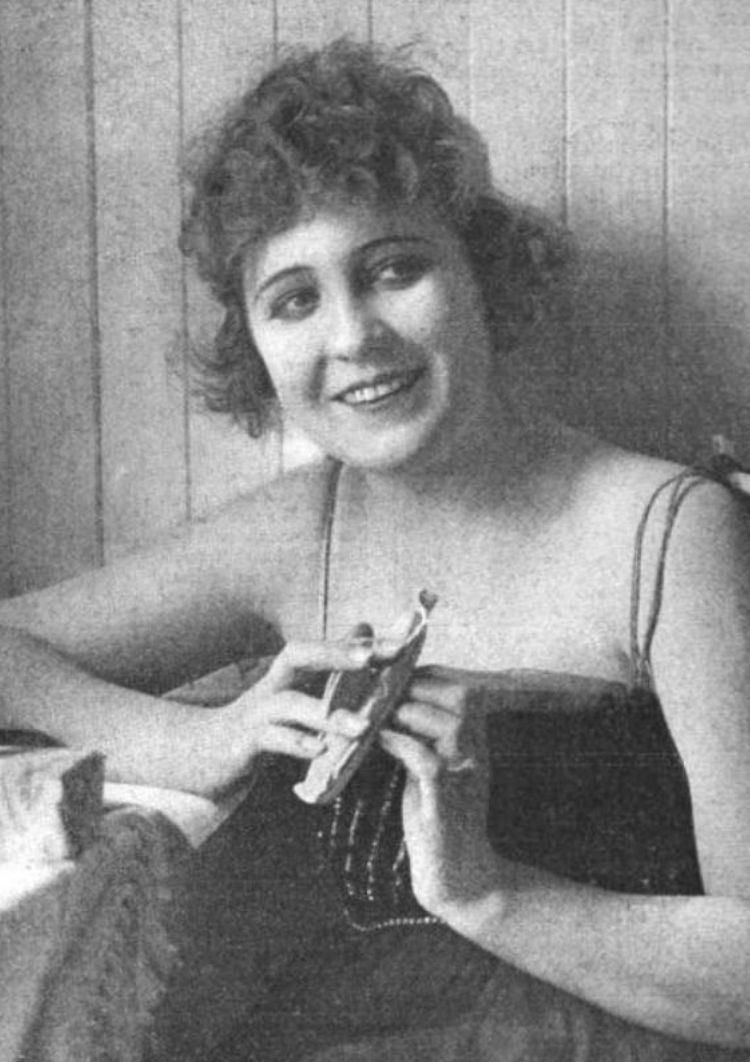
- Alatia Marton, from a 1918 publication
- Born: September 15, 1894; Dallas, Texas, U.S.
- Died: June 4, 1972 (age 77); Dallas, Texas, U.S.
- Occupation: Actress

Alatia Lee Marton (September 15, 1894 – June 4, 1972) was an American actress who appeared in about a dozen silent film shorts between 1917 and 1918.

== Early life and education ==
Marton was born in Dallas, Texas, the daughter of Henry Marton and Clara Anne Davis Marton (later Arnold). She graduated from Dallas High School.

== Career ==
Marton answered phones at a cement company as a young woman. She was one of the eleven winners of a Photoplay Magazine national beauty contest in 1916. She won a screen test, and traveled to Chicago, Detroit, and New York City as part of the contest's publicity tour. She was known as one of Mack Sennett's "Bathing Beauties".

Marton left the film industry to marry in 1918, but returned to Los Angeles later in life, and was active in the Women's Guild of the Church of Religious Science in Beverly Hills.

== Filmography ==
All of Marton's credits were in short silent comedy films from 1917 and 1918.

- A Toy of Fate (1917)
- A Hotel Disgrace (1917)
- A Warm Reception (1917)
- His Taking Ways (1917)
- Pearls and Perils (1917)
- Their Husband (1917, co-starring Harry Depp)
- False to the Finish (1917)
- An Iceman's Bride (1917, starring Mal St. Clair and Eddie Gribbon)
- His Hidden Shame (1918, starring Max Asher, Mal St. Clair, and Eddie Gribbon)
- Ruined by a Dumb Waiter (1918)
- The Kitchen Lady (1918)
- Fork Over (1918)

== Personal life ==
Marton married Marcus McClellan Plowman in 1918; they had a daughter. Her husband died in 1944, her daughter died in 1969, and she died in 1972, at the age of 77, in Dallas.
