= Márton Balázs =

Romanian mathematician (1929–2016)

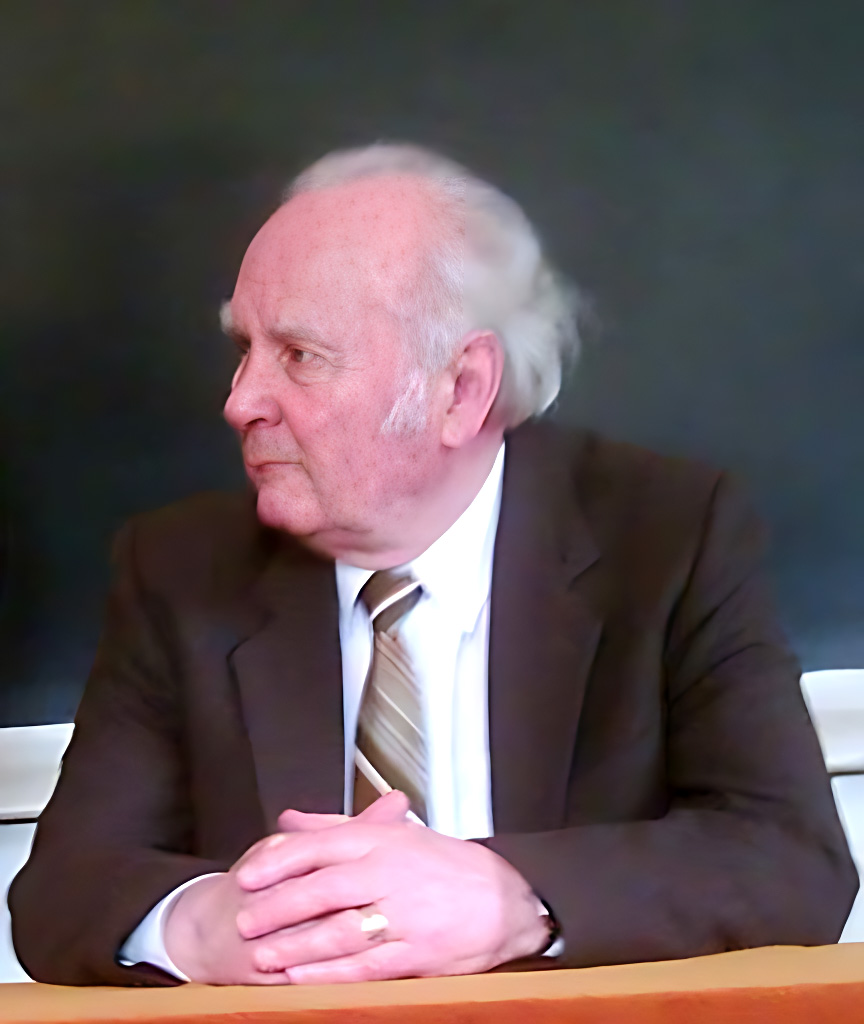
- Born: Márton Balázs; July 17, 1929; Lueta, Kingdom of Romania (now Romania),
- Died: April 13, 2016 (aged 86); Cluj-Napoca, Romania
- Education: Bolyai University
- Occupations: Mathematician; professor
- Children: Márton Ernő Balázs

Márton Balázs (July 17, 1929 – April 13, 2016) was a Romanian mathematician of Hungarian descent.

He was born in Lueta, Odorhei County (now Harghita County), Romania. After graduating from high school in Odorheiu Secuiesc, he got his undergraduate degree a in mathematics and physics from Bolyai University of Cluj-Napoca. He began his professional career there at the Department of General Physics, then continued at the Department of Geometry. He continued his university activities at the merged university, named Babeș-Bolyai University and he received his doctorate degree in 1968. From 1972, he was a lecturer (associate professor) at the Department of Function Theory and Analysis, and from 1990, a university professor. From 1990 to 1992, he was deputy dean. He retired in 1994. His scientific work falls within the field of analysis and numerical analysis (solving equations in abstract spaces). He has published numerous papers in Romanian, English, and French in Romanian and foreign scientific journals. He is the author of several university notes. He was the editor-in-chief of Matematikai Lapok (Mathematical Gazette for high school students) for several years, and for a decade and a half he was the head of the Romanian-language scientific seminar on Mathematics Didactics.
