= Places inhabited by Rusyns =

The contemporary administrative entities roughly corresponding the traditional territory of settlement of the Rusyns. Following areas have been included which still are or up to the World War II were inhabited by each of the Rusyn sub-ethnicities mentioned below:

Dolinyans:

- Ukraine: Zakarpattia Oblast excluding Rakhiv Raion, see Hutsuls;

Boykos:

- Poland: Subcarpathian Voivodship: Bieszczady County, Lesko County; also see the Wikipedia article Operation Vistula;
- Ukraine: Ivano-Frankivsk Oblast: Ivano-Frankivsk Raion, Kalush Raion, Rozhniativskyi Raion; Lviv Oblast: Starosambirskyi Raion, Skolivskyi Raion, Turkivskyi Raion;

Hutsuls:

- Romania: Maramureș County;
- Ukraine: Chernivtsi Oblast: Hlyboka Raion, Putyla Raion, Storozhynets Raion, Vyzhnytsis Raion; Ivano-Frankivsk Oblast: Kosiv Raion, Nadvirna Raion, Verkhovyna Raion, Yaremche City; Zakarpattia Oblast: Rakhiv Raion;

Lemkos:

- Poland: Lesser Poland Voivodeship: Gorlice County, Nowy Sącz County, Nowy Targ County, Tatra County; Subcarpathian Voivodship: Jasło County, Krosno County, Sanok County; also see the Wikipedia article Operation Vistula;
- Slovakia: Košice Region: Michalovce District, Sobrance District, Trebišov District; Prešov Region: Bardejov District, Humenné District, Kežmarok District, Medzilaborce District, Poprad District, Snina District, Stará Ľubovňa District, Stropkov District, Svidník District; Žilina Region: Námestovo District, Tvrdošín District.

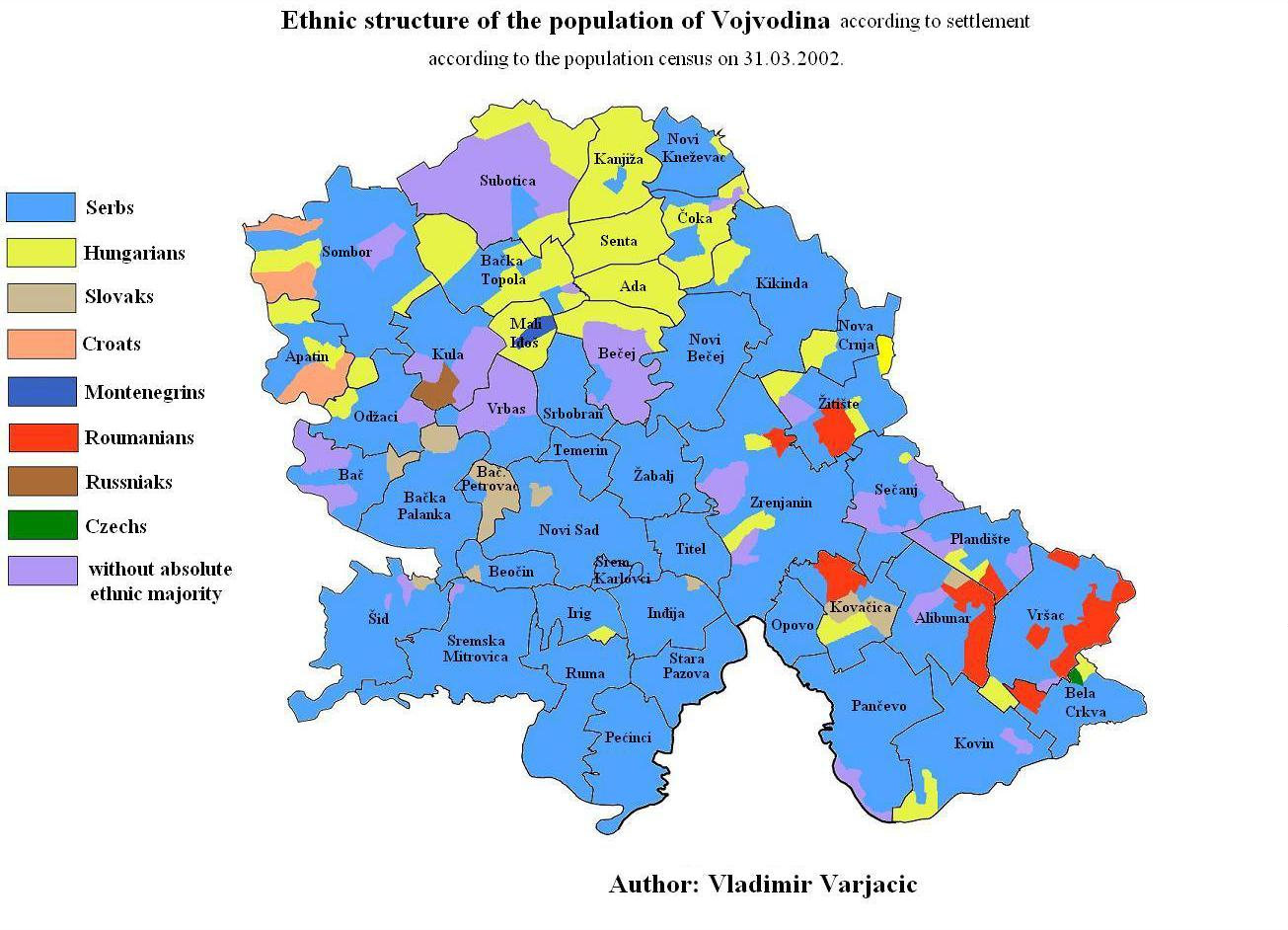
The tiny Rusyn-dominated area in Vojvodina, Serbia according to the census results of 2002 shown in brown.

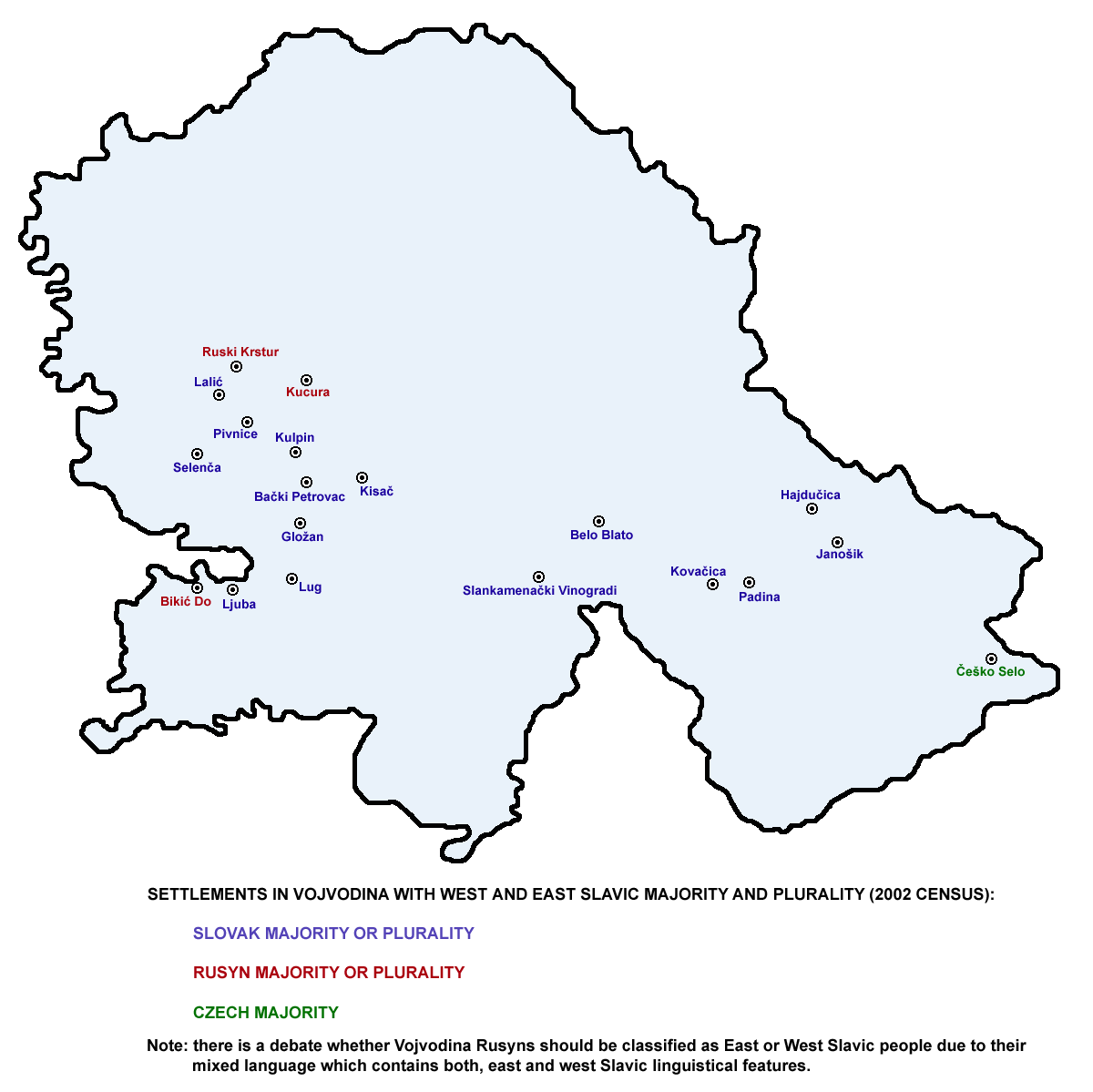
Rusyn settlements in Vojvodina, 2002 census

There are Pannonian Rusyns, too, in Serbia (most notably in Vojvodina), and in Bosnia and Herzegovina, Croatia and Hungary.

For the Rusyn diaspora see the Wikipedia articles Rusyns and Rusyn American. Also see the article Gorals for a group of related Carpathian microethnoses.
