= Vecsey =

Vecsey is a surname. Notable people with the surname include:

- Adolf Vécsey (1916–1979), Hungarian football player
- August von Vécsey (1775–1857) Austrian general of the Napoleonic Wars, father of Károly, relative of Peter
- Franz von Vecsey (1893–1935), Hungarian violinist and composer
- George Vecsey (born 1939), American writer
- Károly Vécsey (1803–1849), Hungarian Army general
- László Vécsey (born 1958), Hungarian politician
- Peter Vecsey (sports columnist) (born 1943), American sports columnist and analyst
- Peter von Vécsey (1768–1809) Austrian general of the Napoleonic Wars killed at the Battle of Wagram, relative of August
