= Bíňovce =

- Municipality
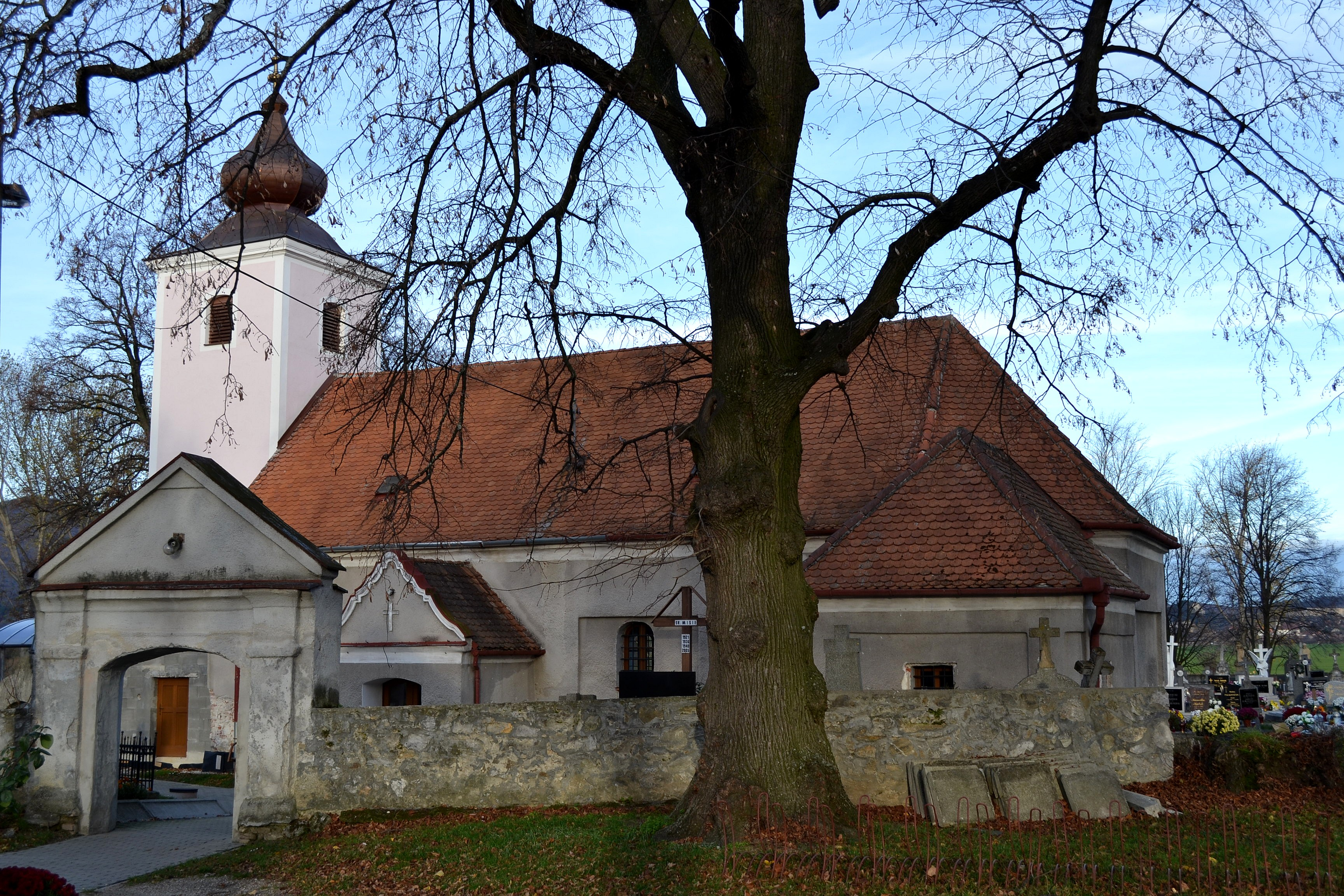
- Archangel Michael Church, Bíňovce

- Flag

- Location of Bíňovce in the Trnava Region Location of Bíňovce in Slovakia
- Coordinates: 48.50°N 17.48°E
- Country: Slovakia
- Region: Trnava Region
- District: Trnava District
- First mentioned: 1330

Area
  - Total: 7.79 km^{2} (3.01 sq mi)
- Elevation: 204 m (669 ft)

Population (2025)
  - Total: 633
- Time zone: UTC+1 (CET)
  - Summer (DST): UTC+2 (CEST)
- Postal code: 919 07
- Area code: +421 33
- Vehicle registration plate (until 2022): TT
- Website: www.binovce.sk

Bíňovce (Hungarian: Binóc) is a municipality of Trnava District in the Trnava Region of Slovakia.

== Geography ==
The municipality lies at an altitude of 204 metres (669 ft) and covers an area of 7.79 km^{2} (3.01 sq mi) (2025).

== Population ==
Population statistic (10 years)
Year	1995	2005	2015	2025
Count	658	664	666	633
Difference		+0.91%	+0.30%	−4.95%

Population statistic
Year	2024	2025
Count	639	633
Difference		−0.93%

It has a population of 633 people (31 December 2025).

=== Ethnicity ===
Census 2021 (1+ %)
Ethnicity	Number	Fraction
Slovak	647	98.92%
Not found out	8	1.22%
Total	654	

In year 2021 was 654 people by ethnicity 647 as Slovak, 8 as Not found out, 2 as Italian, 2 as Polish, 1 as Czech, 1 as Hungarian and 1 as Croatian.

Note on population: The difference values of population numbers in the table "Population statistic" and in the sections "Ethnicity" & "Religion" is caused by the use of various statistical methods.

=== Religion ===
Census 2021 (1+ %)
Religion	Number	Fraction
Roman Catholic Church	526	80.43%
None	98	14.98%
Not found out	7	1.07%
Total	654	

In year 2021 was 654 people by religion 526 from Roman Catholic Church, 98 from None, 7 from Not found out, 5 from Christian Congregations in Slovakia, 5 from Evangelical Church, 4 from Greek Catholic Church, 2 from Apostolic Church, 2 from Ad hoc movements, 1 from Old Catholic Church, 1 from Calvinist Church, 1 from Eastern Orthodox Church, 1 from Islam and 1 from Bahá'i Community.

== Genealogical resources ==
The records for genealogical research are available at the state archive Štátny Archív v Bratislave

- Roman Catholic church records (births/marriages/deaths): 1648-1907 (parish B)

== See also ==
- List of municipalities and towns in Slovakia
