= Gedeon Ráday (interior minister) =

Hungarian politician

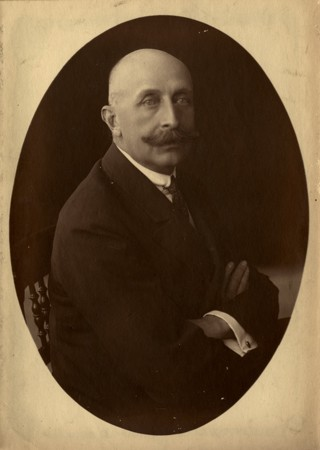

Minister of the Interior of Hungary
- In office 14 April 1921 – 3 December 1921
- Preceded by: Vilmos Pál Tomcsányi
- Succeeded by: Kunó Klebelsberg

Personal details
- Born: October 18, 1872; Budapest, Hungary
- Died: 22 September 1937 (aged 64); Iklad, Hungary
- Political party: Christian National Union Party; Unity Party; Party of National Unity
- Profession: politician

Count Gedeon Ráday de Ráda (18 October 1872, in Budapest – 22 September 1937) was a Hungarian politician, who served as interior minister in 1921. His parents were Gedeon Ráday, a former Minister of Defence of Hungary, and Philippine von Pergen.

Political offices
Preceded by Vilmos Pál Tomcsányi	Minister of the Interior; 1921	Succeeded by Kunó Klebelsberg
