= Gedeon Ráday (minister of defence) =

Hungarian soldier and politician

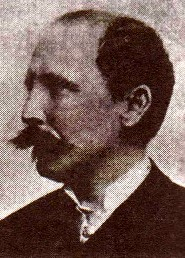
- Born: 4 May 1841; Pécel, Kingdom of Hungary, Austrian Empire
- Died: 26 December 1883 (aged 42); Vienna, Austria-Hungary
- Relatives: Gedeon Ráday
- Military career
- Allegiance: Austrian Empire (to 1867); Kingdom of Hungary (to 1867); Austria-Hungary
- Conflicts: Second Italian War of Independence Austro-Prussian War: Battle of Königgrätz

Count Gedeon Ráday de Ráda (4 May 1841 – 26 December 1883) was a Hungarian soldier and politician, who served as Minister of Defence from 1882 until his death. As a soldier he took part in the Second Italian War of Independence and the Austro-Prussian War. He also fought in the Battle of Königgrätz. Between 1862 and 1865 he was the adjutant of Emperor Franz Joseph. From 1875 Ráday was a representative of the Independent Party but later joined to the Liberal Party. After the unexpected death of Béla Szende he was appointed as Minister of Defence, but similarly to his predecessor Ráday also died under his office holding. His son was Gedeon VII Ráday who became Interior Minister during the Regency.

Political offices
Preceded by Béla Szende	Minister of Defence; 1882–1883	Succeeded by Béla Orczy
