= István Rakovszky =

Hungarian politician

Noble István Rakovszky de Nagyrákó et Nagyselmecz
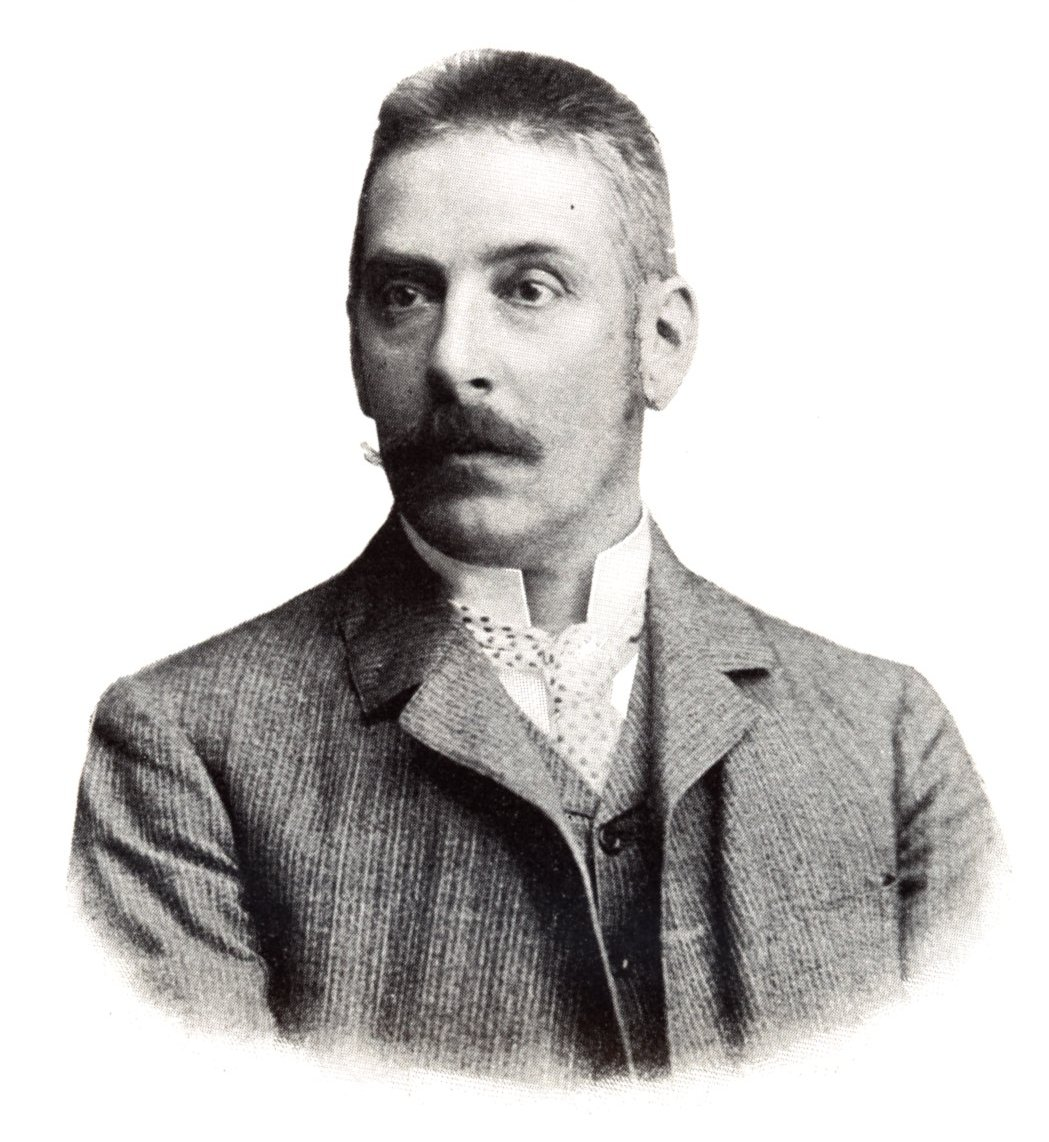

Prime Minister of the Rival Government of the Kingdom of Hungary
- In office 21 October – 26 October 1921
- Monarch: Charles IV

Speaker of the National Assembly of Hungary
- In office 18 February 1920 – 30 July 1921
- Succeeded by: Gaszton Gaál

Personal details
- Born: 18 June 1858 Vienna, Austrian Empire
- Died: 12 August 1931 (aged 73) Budapest, Kingdom of Hungary
- Party: Catholic People's Party, KGSZP, KNEP
- Spouse: Mária Majthényi de Kesselőkeő
- Children: Egon; Miklós; Mária; Zsófia
- Profession: Politician

István Rakovszky de Nagyrákó et Nagyselmecz (18 June 1858 – 12 August 1931) was a legitimist Hungarian politician. During the Second Royal coup d'état, Charles IV returned to Hungary to retake his throne. The attempt was unsuccessful. The king formed a rival government in Sopron and appointed Rakovszky as Prime Minister.

== Biography ==
=== Early life ===
Born in Vienna, Rakovszky's parents were István Rakovszky (1832–1891) and Baroness Ilona Majthényi (1839–1903). He had three siblings: Béla (Adalbert), Ferenc, and Marianne. István Rakovszky married Baroness Mária Majthényi de Kesselőkeő: their children were Egon, Miklós, Mária, and Zsófia.

He finished his secondary school studies in Pozsony (now: Bratislava, Slovakia). After studying law, he joined the Austro-Hungarian Army but he had to demobilize because of illness. He travelled to Venice for treatment. Returning to Liptó County, he settled in his Estate near Nagyselmec. He soon played a significant role in the county's opposition movements. He had been to France many times.

=== Political career ===
At the time of the ecclesiastical political fights, he took part in the foundation of the Catholic People's Party in 1895 and served as deputy chairman of the party from 1903. He became a known politician after the Catholic Congress of 1896 where he talked about the social objectives of Christian politics as a lecturer with an unusual manner. Rakovszky belonged to the Catholic political movements' conservative-feudal wing.

He was member of the House of Representatives from 1896 to 1918 and of the Diet of Hungary from 1918 to 1926. He was one of the plenary sessions' most active representative. He represented Csorna until 1918 as politician of the Catholic People's Party. He served as parliamentarian clerk between 1896 and 1899. Rakovszky signed in the names of his party the pact between the opposition and Prime Minister Kálmán Széll on 23 February 1899. He participated in the reforming of law about the representative incompatibility.

Rakovszky gave hundreds of speeches in parliament; he regularly took the floor during discussion of the budget year and the house rules. Besides these, his interests covered foreign policy, and internal political and economic topics.

He held the position of deputy speaker of the House of Representatives between 1905 and 1910 (second deputy speaker to 1906; first to 1910). He was a member of the Coalition's leading committee during the Hungarian Constitutional Crisis of 1903–1907. The king Francis Joseph requested his advice on the evolving situation. On 19 February 1906, he stood in for the then ill Speaker of the House of Representatives, Gyula Justh, when the army occupied the diet to dissolve it. In the course of the diet, he protested against the armed occupation and sent back unopened the two royal dispatches to the king's military commissioner.

As deputy speaker, he presided more than 130 plenary sessions during the parliamentary term of 1906–1911. He criticized Sándor Wekerle's government program. Francis Joseph appointed him secret councillor in 1907. He served as chairman of the League of Catholic People from 26 January 1908. On the open seance of the National Assembly of 1910–1918, he demanded, as the leader of the People's Party, the modification of the ecclesiastical political laws in a conservative direction and the lawful guarantee of the regularity of the elections.

During the First World War, he did military service, fought on the Russian and Italian fronts, but he also took part in the House of Representatives' wartime session. The opposition wanted to place a three-member control commission beside the government, seeing the mistakes that happened in the leading of the foreign affairs and national defenses. Gyula Andrássy the Younger, Albert Apponyi and István Rakovszky were appointed the so-known control-commission's member. However, their work failed because of the Minister, beside the King István Burián's passive resistance, so their professions were given back. Many of his interpellations were over in this cycle to the Prime Minister and ministers. He recommended making it easier for the wartime woundeds' relatives to travel, such as by offering cheaper fares. He joined the discussion about the public servants' newer wartime aid and to the debates of a wartime foreign policy. He proposed firstly the giving of vote to the world war heroes' franchise on 25 April 1915. In this sense, the franchise would have been all men ages twenty or older who fought in the front. The moderate opposition espoused his proposal, but Prime Minister István Tisza and the governing party rejected the bill.

After the fall of the Tisza cabinet, the Catholic People's party politics also bankrupted. On 29 October 1918, Archduke Joseph August appointed Count János Hadik Prime Minister. Rakovszky was elected to the position of Minister beside the King. However, the Aster Revolution broke out on 31 October 1918 and Mihály Károlyi and the National Council took over the power.

During the transition period, he briefly retired. At the time of the Hungarian Soviet Republic, he was arrested for a brief period of time and his political documents were confiscated. From Autumn 1919, he represented the Christian national direction. From September, he served as member of the Catholic Economical and Social Party's Presidential Council. This party merged with the Christian National Party and the KNEP established. Rakovszky became a member of the National Assembly in 1920 as the KNEP representative.

Rakovszky was appointed Speaker of the National Assembly of Hungary on 18 February 1920. He was one of the signers of the temporary direction of the sovereign power's practice in this quality. He observed the house rules watchfully, forcefully and impartially. He gave his most memorable speech on 4 June 1920, at the time of the signing of the Treaty of Trianon: "The treaty will be signed today, which causes cutting up our millennial country. It is called peace treaty, which does not promise eternal peace, but eternal unrest, constant agitation, not affectionate cooperation in the interest of achievement of the humanity's great and noble aims, but this suitable to create discord and dislike between the folk and forms new and discords lasting long artificially." He also served as chairman of the Committee Economics and Committee of Library and finally the three-member commission for the investigation of the bills. Rakovszky had lot of conflicts with the István Bethlen cabinet and the Independent Smallholders' Party, which was led by István Szabó de Nagyatád because of his treatment method of the house rules. As a result, he resigned on 30 July 1921.

After his resignation, he became part of the offensive opposition of the government with the sharpest key. Many times, he proposed the check of the parliament's quorum. His number immunity and personal case got in front of the parliament. During the plenary session of Autumn 1921, Ibrahim György Kövér tried to kill him; a detachment officer fired at him many times, but missed so Rakovszky survived the assassination attempt.

==== Second royal coup d'état ====
In June, the legitimists, sensing that the government was taking no real action to bring Charles back, launched a major offensive against Miklós Horthy and Bethlen. Bethlen was a legitimist at heart but one who understood that there was no chance for a restored monarchy at the time. They aimed to undermine Horthy's prestige, weaken his power and create favourable conditions for Charles' return. In response, Horthy and Bethlen began secret discussions with legitimist leaders in early August, preferring to deal with them rather than with the pro-democracy Smallholder faction of István Szabó de Nagyatád. In principle, as early as August, the government began to prepare Charles' return. For instance, at the end of that month, the Hungarian minister in Paris informed leaders at the French Foreign Ministry that his return was unavoidable due to public opinion.

Although Rakovszky belonged to the moderate wing of the legitimists, he played a deciding role in the preparation of the second coup after the first recurrence experiment together with Baron Antal Lehár, Gusztáv Gratz and Ödön Beniczky. They had a discussion with Schager, the king's chief of staff in Rakovszky's flat on 8 October. Rakovszky sketched the internal political conditions of the royal coup on this negotiation, since he would have been the prospective government's leader. He wanted to avoid the appearance of a military coup, which is why he traveled as a prospective prime minister in front of the king to the western border. Rakovszky joined to the king, who arrived in Sopron on 21 October 1921. Here Charles IV formed a rival government which was led by Rakovszky. The legitimists withdrew onto Tata because of the disorganization, the indecisive measures and the Battle of Budaörs. They were arrested here on 25 October 1921 and Rakovszky was interned to Tihany along with the royal couple. He was arrested together with Count Gyula Andrássy, Count Antal Sigray and Gusztáv Gratz.

=== Later life ===
After the dethronement of the Habsburgs, Andrássy left the KNEP with his supporters on 4 January 1922. Rakovszky was a founding member of the National Farmer and Civic Party, better known as Andrássy Party. He criticized the government heavily: he had a duel with Minister of the Interior Vilmos Pál Tomcsányi and had lot of conflicts with Minister of Religion and Education József Vass.

On 5 October 1922, a group formed against the organizations of the far right forces. Their aim was the elimination of the Gyula Gömbös bloc and the promotion of the real political consolidation. The leaders were Vilmos Vázsonyi, Károly Rassay, Károly Peyer, István Farkas and István Rakovszky, who could mobilize his liberal connections. Bethlen attacked this association, but he made use of this group to the accepting of the measures that abolished Gömbös' organization. On 14 November 1922, the parliamentarian opposition accepted a common decision, in which the program was condemned and required their prohibition. Rakovszky's signature also appeared on the list.

He retired from the politics in 1926. He was a member of the National Assembly for almost 30 years. Rakovszky died on 12 August 1931 at the age of 73.

Political offices
Preceded by Gyula Wlassics; House of Magnates	Speaker of the National Assembly; 1920–1921	Succeeded by Gaszton Gaál
Preceded by Károly Szász; House of Representatives	Speaker of the National Assembly; 1920–1921	Succeeded by Gaszton Gaál
