= Charles IV of Hungary's attempts to retake the throne =

1921 failed coups d'état in the Kingdom of Hungary

Charles IV of Hungary's attempts to retake throne
Location
Result
Hungary
Both attempts unsuccessful
- Charles IV exiled
- Miklós Horthy secures power

Belligerents
| (Kingdom of Hungary (1920–1946)) Legitimists | (Kingdom of Hungary (1920–1946)) Free-electors; Supported by: Czechoslovakia; Yugoslavia; Romania (second attempt) |

Commanders and leaders
| Charles IV of Hungary; József Vass; Antal Lehár; István Rakovszky (second attempt) | Miklós Horthy; Pál Teleki; Gyula Gömbös (second attempt) |

Casualties and losses
| 19 dead, 62 wounded | Unknown, at least 14 |

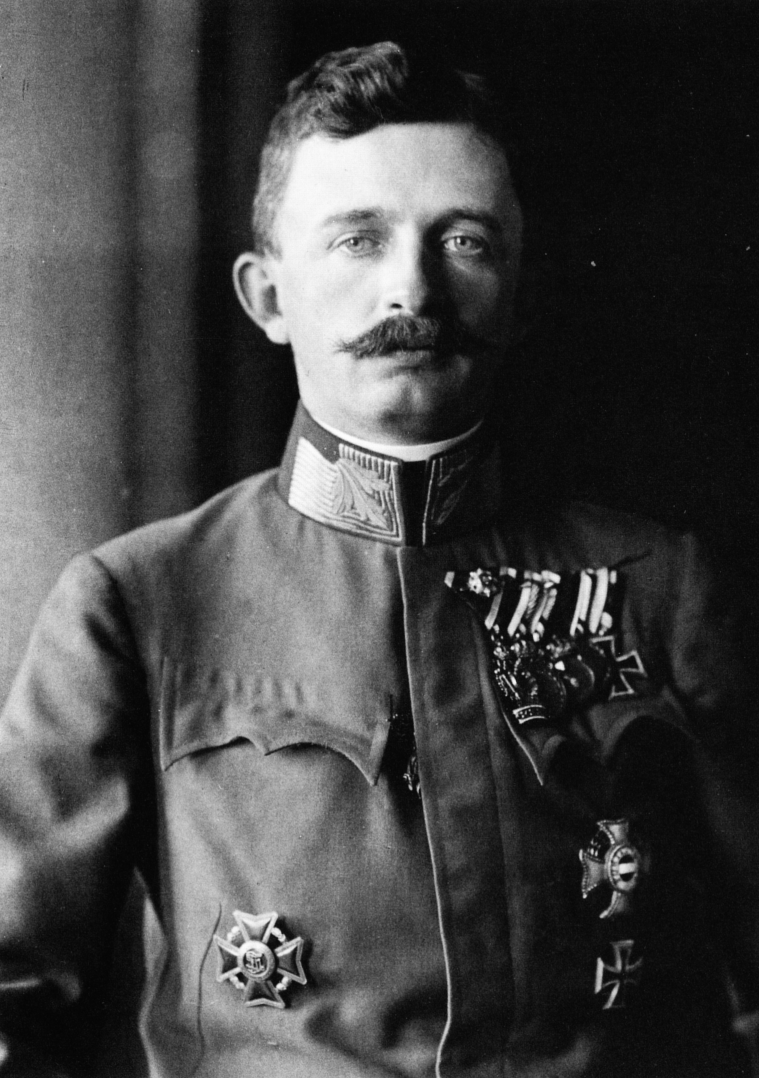
Charles IV of Hungary

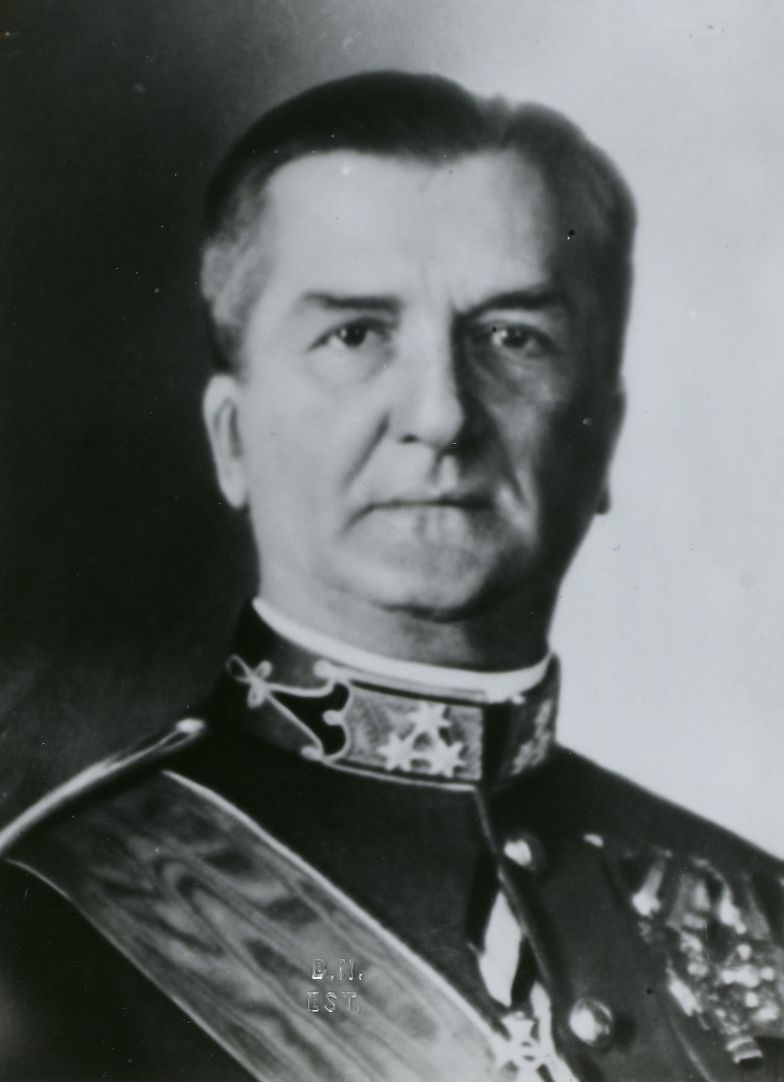
Regent Miklós Horthy

After Miklós Horthy was chosen Regent of Hungary on 1 March 1920, Charles I of Austria, who had reigned in Hungary as Charles IV, made two unsuccessful attempts to retake the throne. His attempts are also called the "First" and "Second Royal coups d'état" (Hungarian: első és második királypuccs) respectively.

== Background ==
On 13 November 1918, Charles issued a proclamation in which he relinquished his right to take part in Hungarian affairs of state. He also released the officials in the Hungarian half of the empire from their oath of loyalty to him. This came two days after he issued a similar statement withdrawing from Austrian politics. Although these statements have been described as abdications, Charles deliberately avoided using that term in the event the people of either nation recalled him.

Charles's last Hungarian prime minister, Mihály Károlyi, took advantage of the situation and proclaimed the Hungarian Democratic Republic, with himself as provisional president. The continued Allied occupation made Károlyi's situation untenable, and in March 1919 he was pushed out of office by a Social Democratic-Communist coalition that proclaimed the Hungarian Soviet Republic. Under the Communist leader Béla Kun, Hungary became the world's second Communist nation. However, Kun's government was overthrown in August by the Romanian Armed Forces. Eventually, Archduke Joseph August, Charles' cousin, took power as regent for Charles, only to be forced out when the Allies refused to recognize him.

It soon became apparent that the Allies would not accept a Habsburg as Hungary's head of state. Finally, in March 1920, Miklós Horthy, the last commander of the Austro-Hungarian Navy, was named regent of Hungary. The newly elected legislature nullified the actions and legally erased both the People's Republic and the Soviet Republic of Hungary via Act 1 of 1920.

== Easter Crisis ==
Easter Crisis
- Part of Charles IV of Hungary's attempts to retake the throne
- Date: 26–27 March 1921
- Location: Szombathely and Budapest, Kingdom of Hungary
- Goals: Restoration of Charles IV as King of Hungary
- Result: Restoration unsuccessful: Charles IV returns to Switzerland

Parties
| Legitimists | Free-electors Supported by: Czechoslovakia; Yugoslavia |

Lead figures
| Charles IV of Hungary; József Vass; Antal Lehár | Miklós Horthy; Pál Teleki |

The former king's first coup attempt began on 26 March 1921. This was Holy Saturday that year: the diet was not in session, the diplomatic corps was away in the country, and Regent Horthy planned a quiet holiday with his family in the royal palace. Charles, prompted by suggestions from his immediate Swiss entourage and trusting in the promises of certain European royalist circles, took advantage of this quiet. Despite warnings by many of his supporters and by Horthy himself that the time was not right to return to the throne, he was optimistic, believing that the mere news of his reappearance and Horthy's willingness to hand over power would revive Hungarians' love for their king. His secret negotiations with French Prime Minister Aristide Briand led him to expect French support if he succeeded, and no armed intervention from Hungary's neighbours.

At the time, the Hungarian diet was dominated by two right-wing monarchist parties, the Christian National Union Party and the Smallholders. The difference was that most Christian Union members were legitimists, seeing Charles IV as Hungary's legitimate king and favouring his restoration to power. Most Smallholders were free-electors and held that Hungarians were now free to choose as king anyone they wished.

Shorn of his moustache and armed with a forged Spanish passport, Charles left Wartegg Castle in Switzerland and arrived undetected at Szombathely on 26 March. There he made his way to the palace of Count János Mikes, a prominent legitimist; the news spread quickly among local legitimists and by the early hours of 27 March Charles had a small privy council, including József Vass, Horthy's Minister of Education, and Colonel Antal Lehár. The latter placed himself and his soldiers at Charles' disposal but warned of significant military risks. Charles agreed to summon Prime Minister Count Pál Teleki (who was staying nearby) for negotiations. Teleki, roused from his sleep at 2:00 am, muttered "too soon, too soon" before Charles and urged him to return, averring that otherwise civil war would break out and the Little Entente would intervene. Eventually it was agreed that Charles must meet Horthy; Teleki left by car for Budapest at 6:30 am, with Charles following an hour later. Teleki's car arrived much later in the day, having taken a wrong turn; some suspect that the "wrong turn" was a pretext by Teleki to remain uninvolved, as the Szombathely-Budapest road is a straight one.

Charles arrived at the palace totally unannounced early on the afternoon of the 27th, just as Horthy was sitting down to an Easter dinner with his wife. Horthy's aide-de-camp tried to draw him away from the table, but Horthy's wife Magdolna insisted her husband should at least be allowed to finish his soup in peace. Horthy then withdrew and, having no time to phone his advisers, grappled with the situation himself. Within minutes he was embracing Charles and leading him into the Regent's (formerly the King's) office. There followed an emotional two-hour discussion that Horthy would later describe as "the most difficult moments in my entire life" and a "thoroughly odious" experience. Charles thanked Horthy for his service as regent but said the time had come to "hand over power to me"; Horthy replied, "This is a disaster. In the name of God, Your Majesty must leave at once and return to Switzerland, before it's too late and the Powers learn of your presence in Budapest". Charles said he had "burned his bridges", and, speaking in German, spent the rest of the meeting using numerous arguments to break down the flustered Horthy's resistance. He reminded Horthy of his tearful pledge of loyalty made at Schönbrunn Palace in November 1918, and of the sworn oath of obedience to the Habsburg monarch from which he had never been released. Horthy reminded him that he had more recently sworn an oath to the Hungarian nation. Shocked by Horthy's recalcitrance, Charles eventually said: "I stick by my position. I'll give you five minutes to think it over". During this break Horthy composed himself (Charles seemed exhausted), reiterated his fear of civil war, and was sceptical about Charles' claim to have assurances of support from Briand. Horthy was created Prince of Otranto & Szeged and was awarded the Grand Cross of the Military Order of Maria Theresia, both distinctions which he didn't use.

A tentative three-week truce was reached that both men interpreted differently. Horthy expected Charles to leave Hungary and either march on Vienna or retire to Switzerland. Charles assumed that, whether or not he invaded Austria, Horthy would strive to facilitate his restoration within three weeks. Leaving by a back door and catching cold (he was given no overcoat), Charles was driven to Szombathely while Horthy spent the evening recounting the meeting in ever more dramatic fashion. Over the next few days, both men remained firm, but Charles' position began to suffer. On 28 March, Czechoslovak and Yugoslav envoys declared a restoration would be a casus belli; on 1 April the diet (with legitimists abstaining) passed a unanimous resolution praising Horthy's conduct and endorsing the status quo, and calls for Charles' arrest grew (Horthy adamantly refused this); by 3 April Briand publicly denied any deal had been made. With the army still loyal to Horthy, Charles reluctantly left by train on 5 April, reaching Hertenstein Palace the next day. A proclamation of his that he was Hungary's rightful ruler appeared in Hungarian newspapers on 7 April. The Swiss government placed stricter limits on his political activity.

Charles left Hungary with a deep antipathy toward Horthy, persisting in his belief that the great powers would not oppose a restoration and that (notwithstanding the vote in Parliament), the Hungarian people truly yearned for his return. In fact, no demonstrations of support occurred in Hungary during the "Easter Crisis", except on a small scale in the traditionally royalist western counties, and while he was treated respectfully at Szombathely, officers wavered in their support and the people generally treated him with indifference. A shaken and badly damaged Teleki resigned on 6 April and Horthy appointed Count István Bethlen in his stead eight days later.

== Interlude ==
In June, the legitimists, sensing that the government was taking no real action to bring Charles back, launched a major offensive against Horthy and Bethlen. While Bethlen was a legitimist at heart, he was sober enough to realize that there was no chance for a restored monarchy at the time. They aimed to undermine Horthy's prestige, weaken his power and create favourable conditions for Charles' return. In response, Horthy and Bethlen began secret discussions with legitimist leaders in early August (preferring to deal with them rather than with the pro-democracy Smallholder faction of István Szabó de Nagyatád). In principle, as early as August, the government began to prepare Charles' return: for instance, at the end of that month the Hungarian minister in Paris informed leaders at the French Foreign Ministry that his return was unavoidable due to public opinion.

== March on Budapest ==
March on Budapest
- Part of Charles IV of Hungary's attempts to retake the throne
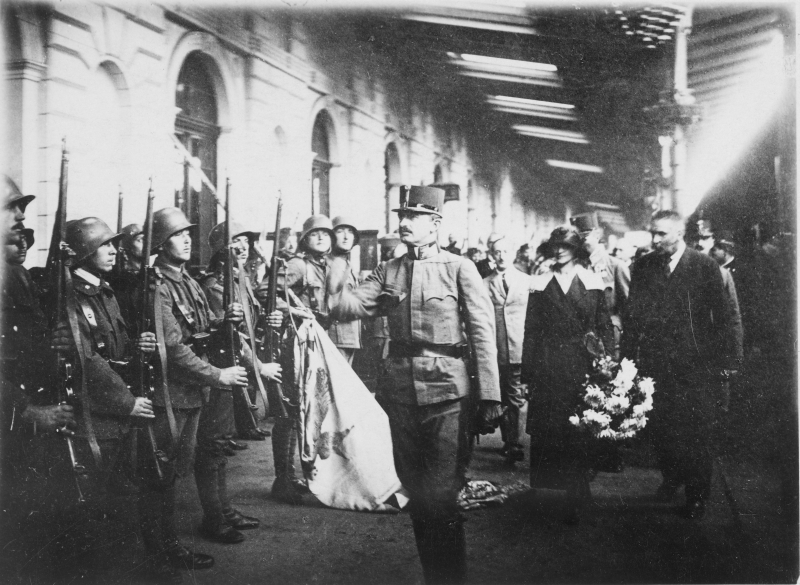
- Charles IV and Zita in Sopron during the March on Budapest
- Date: 21 October – 6 November 1921
- Location: Kingdom of Hungary
- Goals: Restoration of Charles IV as King of Hungary
- Result: Restoration unsuccessful: Charles IV leaves to Romania; Nullification of the Pragmatic Sanction of 1713

Parties
| Legitimists | Free-electors Supported by: Czechoslovakia; Yugoslavia; Romania |

Lead figures
| Charles IV of Hungary; István Rakovszky; Ödön Beniczky; Gyula Andrássy the Younger; Gusztáv Gratz; Antal Lehár; Albert Apponyi | Miklós Horthy; Gyula Gömbös |

Casualties and losses
| 19 dead, 62 wounded | 14 dead |

On 21 October, Bethlen, having reached an agreement with the legitimist leader Andrássy, made an ill-timed speech to moderate legitimist aristocrats in Pécs, declaring that "the exercise of royal power is not just a right but a necessity"; that Charles' declaration of November 1918, forfeiting participation in the conduct of state affairs, was made under duress and therefore invalid; and that he would begin negotiations with the Great Powers at the "appropriate time" in order to convince them to accept a restoration. However, he also denounced attempts to restore Charles by force.

The previous day, after dictating his will, Charles had made a daredevil flight from Dübendorf airport in an Ad Astra Aero Junkers F 13 monoplane (CH-59), landing surreptitiously in western Hungary. On 23 October, a Treaty of Versailles-mandated plebiscite was scheduled to occur in the Burgenland (with a choice between Austria and Hungary on offer), and in mid-October Colonel Lehár, Count Gyula Ostenburg-Moravek, and other legitimist officers had decided to take advantage of the tense situation, sending Charles a message that he should try to seize power before 23 October. They wrote, "The domestic political situation is such that when His Majesty enters Budapest no sort of opposition is to be expected. To the contrary, the restoration will be greeted everywhere with jubilation". Not informed that some of Hungary's most prominent legitimists had no knowledge of the plan, Charles thought this was the long-awaited cry for help from the Hungarian nation, declaring, "The Hungarians need me". He was prepared to take power by force, assumed that the Little Entente could not mount an attack within a day or two, and that the Great Powers would accept a fait accompli by that time.

After landing on a field belonging to the legitimist Count József Cziráky in the village of Dénesfa, Charles quickly made his way to Sopron. Having no intention to seek compromise with Horthy, whose cabinet he considered illegitimate, he formed a provisional government:

- Prime Minister: István Rakovszky
- Minister of the Interior: Ödön Beniczky
- Minister of Foreign Affairs: Count Gyula Andrássy, highly sceptical and disheartened but dutiful
- Minister of Finance and Industry: Gusztáv Gratz
- Minister of Defence: Baron Antal Lehár
- Minister of Education: Count Albert Apponyi.

On the afternoon of 21 October, while Bethlen was speaking, a group of armoured trains was being equipped in Sopron. This royal armada was guarded by Ostenburg's troops, who were apparently told that communism had erupted in Budapest and that Horthy had called for Charles' help to restore order. In a stirring mass ceremony, the battalion took the traditional Honvéd oath of loyalty to "Charles of Habsburg, King of Hungary and King of Bohemia". Departing for Budapest (some 190 kilometres (120 mi) away) late that morning, the armada proceeded more like a ceremonial excursion in the countryside than a relentless military advance, stopping at each village station to have the local garrison and public officials take the oath of loyalty and to allow groups of loyal peasants to chant "long live the King!" and pay homage to the royal couple. It took ten hours to make the 80-kilometre (50 mi) Sopron-Győr trip, a delay that allowed Horthy to regroup.

A report reached Horthy late on 21 October; he was shocked that Lehár and Ostenburg had betrayed him. Bethlen presided over a cabinet meeting the next morning at 9:30 am, and there he communicated his decision that force would be used if necessary. Horthy, citing the danger that Hungary would be destroyed, made a military proclamation that he would keep power and demanded loyalty from his army. Many officers, especially older ones, preferred a "wait and see" strategy, and most of those whose units were stationed along the royal armada's path found it impossible (or inexpedient) to be disloyal to Charles. The officers and soldiers of the Győr garrison took the oath of loyalty about the time Horthy was making his proclamation; Komárom also capitulated later that day. The highest military officers in Budapest were reluctant to assume command of the government's forces, and several declined the task. Furthermore, of the twelve commanders of battalions outside Budapest, only two reported that they could reach the city ready for combat by the 23rd, and the Budapest garrison was suspected of unreliability. The Entente powers reaffirmed their opposition to a restoration, while the Czechoslovak, Yugoslav and Romanian ministers declared that such a move would be regarded as a casus belli. Horthy sent a letter to Charles, begging him to give up, but the latter did not even read the letter. Gyula Gömbös did however manage to assemble a ragtag battalion of 400-500 poorly equipped volunteers (many University of Budapest students) to be used for bolstering meagre army support.

On the morning of 23 October, Hungary seemed on the brink of civil war. Charles' army was on the outskirts of Budapest, 30 kilometres (20 mi) of clear track from the suburban rail station of Kelenföld. Martial law had been declared in Budapest, while Czechoslovakia was reported to be mobilising. British envoy Thomas Hohler sent a telegram to London asserting that "all is lost", anticipating Charles' entry into Budapest that afternoon. Horthy received news that if the legitimists launched an attack, the defence would collapse.

The first indication of a turn of events came at 9:00 am, when legitimist General Pál Hegedűs came to Kelenföld station. Somewhat vacillating, he was persuaded to see Horthy and Bethlen in person. The latter denounced Charles's "mad enterprise", while Hohler informed Hegedűs that Britain "would never recognise Charles and would never permit the return of a Habsburg". He warned that Budapest, if taken by royal troops, would be occupied by the Czechs within a week. Hegedűs, who had trusted Charles's assurances that the great powers backed him, now denied being associated with him and offered to broker an armistice.

After meeting with the general, Horthy went with Gömbös to the station, guarded by a largely volunteer force. In a rousing speech, he urged the troops to hold their position, else Austria-Hungary would be revived and Hungary resume her inferior position. Gömbös exhorted them to fight, claiming Charles' army consisted mostly of "Austrian and Czech adventurers".

This intervention emboldened the army, as there was sporadic fire in the direction of Charles' forces all morning. Additionally, sometime before noon an advance contingent of Ostenburg's army was fired upon as it approached the station. In the only significant military engagement of the restoration attempt, 14 government troops and five of Ostenburg's were killed in the Battle of Budaörs (a village close to the capital). Word of the skirmish (which resulted in a government victory) electrified the ex-king's officers, for they had assumed to march on Budapest would be bloodless; civil war was now quite possible.

By noon on 23 October, the tide was clearly shifting in Horthy's direction, and the regent began to regain his confidence. That afternoon, as Hegedűs returned to the royal military headquarters just east of Kelenföld, the mood in the Hungarian officer corps also grew more pro-Horthy. Further adding to their disillusionment was that many believed Horthy would welcome Charles' return and that the march was largely ceremonial; and that there was no Bolshevist eruption. Seeing Horthy was determined to resist, Charles reluctantly agreed to armistice negotiations, arranging a truce until the following morning.

Talks began in Biatorbágy at 8:00 am on 24 October, by which time Horthy had a decisive military advantage. Harsh terms were composed (Charles was called on to order his troops to lay down arms and turn over all war material); Charles's safety would be guaranteed if he abdicated in writing. In return all supporters of the restoration, "except agitators and ringleaders", would be amnestied. As Charles read these terms shots rang out and a stray bullet hit the royal train; he was quickly bundled into the train, which began to move westward. The indignant Lehár and Ostenburg called for a "last stand" and a "fight to the last drop of blood", but Charles, in resignation, ordered the train to stop and from his window shouted, "Lehár! Ostenburg! Stop and come back here! I forbid any more fighting! It's all quite senseless now..." He then dictated a surrender order.

The government now moved decisively to restore domestic order and defuse the growing international crisis. Prominent legitimists such as Count Sigray, Count Andrássy and Gusztáv Gratz were arrested. The King and Queen, temporarily sheltered on the estate of Count Móric Esterházy, were arrested at Tata and placed under military custody in a monastery in Tihany. Charles complied with all the requests except that he did not abdicate the throne.

Despite the clear government victory, Czechoslovakia and Yugoslavia refused to demobilise the army divisions they were deploying on Hungary's borders. On 29 October, Edvard Beneš, Foreign Minister of Czechoslovakia, hoping to exploit the situation, presented an ultimatum threatening an invasion if the Habsburgs were not dethroned, the Little Entente did not participate in disarming Hungary, and Hungary did not show a willingness to compensate Prague for its troop mobilisation. Horthy thought this was outrageous, though Hohler dissuaded him from mobilising his own army to resist invasion. On 1 November, when an invasion seemed imminent, Bethlen informed Hohler that Hungary placed itself entirely in the hands of the great powers and would conform to their decisions. He gave assurances that legislation would be passed excluding the Habsburgs, and Horthy urged his officers that all insurgents should be evacuated from western Hungary, else he would do so himself.

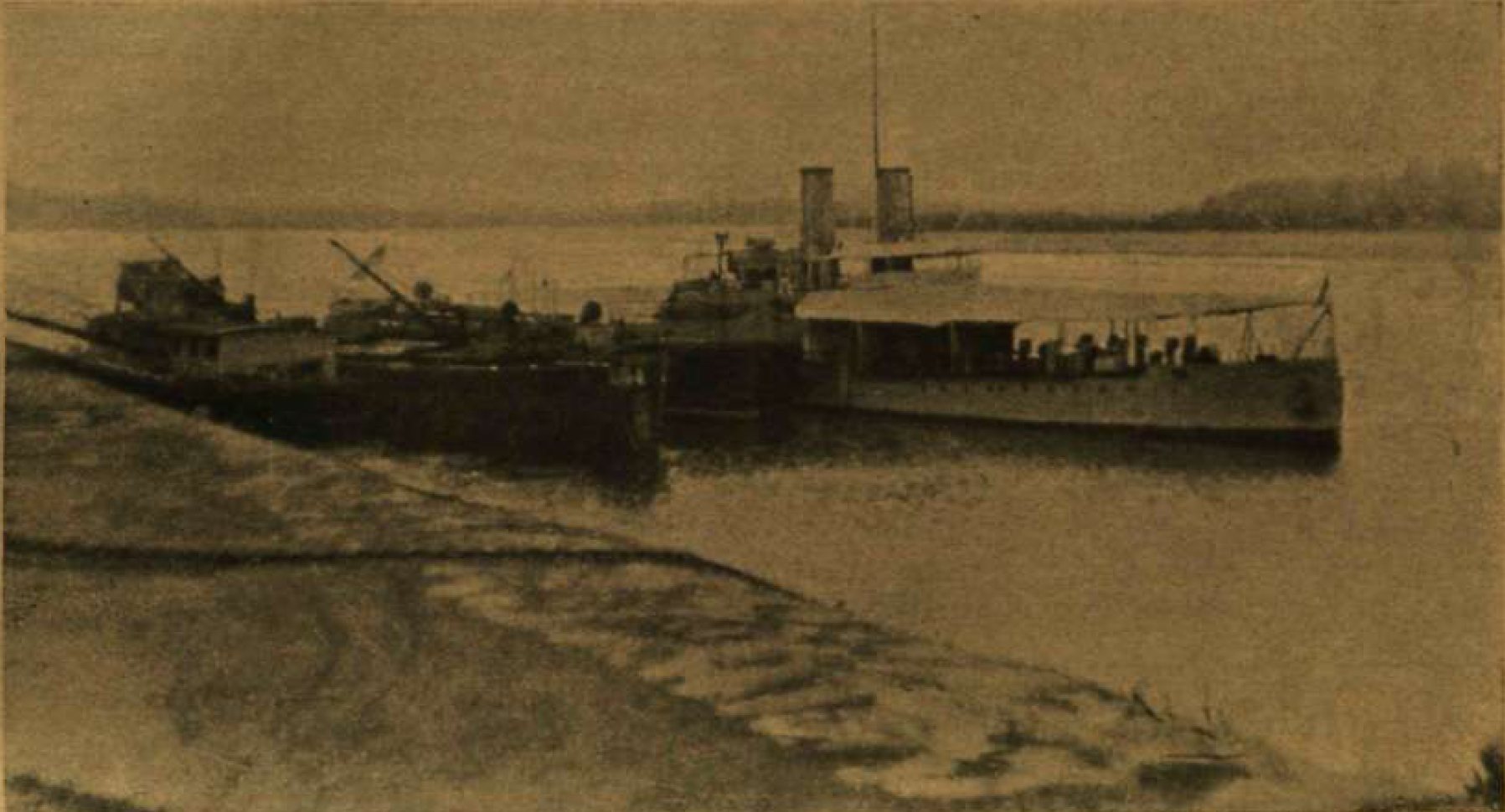
HMS Glowworm anchoring at Baja

Bethlen's maneuver, Horthy's plea, the departure of Charles and Zita on 1 November, and stern British and French warnings to Beneš defused the crisis. On 3 November Bethlen presented Parliament with a bill that would nullify the Pragmatic Sanction of 1713. Passed on 6 November, this in essence dethroned the Habsburg dynasty, though Hungary remained a monarchy and a Habsburg could theoretically be elected king in the future. Charles, having been taken down the Danube to Galați, Romania, was later forced into exile on Madeira. Shattered by his failure, his health deteriorated month by month until he died on 1 April 1922. It was clear that his 10-year-old son and heir Otto would not play an active political role for years, and the Hungarian royalist movement was never to recover its former influence. To the surprise of many, though, Horthy appeared at a memorial service held for Charles at the Matthias Church in Budapest shortly thereafter, discharging a final duty to his former king.
