= Gaszton Gaál =

Hungarian landowner, ornithologist and politician (1868–1932)

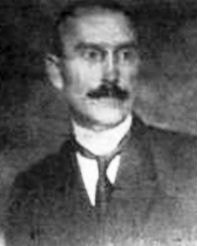

Speaker of the National Assembly of Hungary
- In office 12 August 1921 – 16 August 1922
- Preceded by: Iván Rakovszky
- Succeeded by: Béla Scitovszky

Personal details
- Born: 30 November 1868 Székesfehérvár, Austria-Hungary
- Died: 26 October 1932 (aged 63) Balatonboglár, Kingdom of Hungary
- Party: Independence Party, National Smallholders' Party, Unity Party, Agrarian Party, FKGP
- Profession: ornithologist, politician

Gaszton Gaál de Gyula (or Gaal) (30 November 1868 – 26 October 1932) was a Hungarian landowner, ornithologist and politician, who served as Speaker of the National Assembly of Hungary between 1921 and 1922.

== Postings ==
Gaál was a member of the Diet of Hungary session from 1906 to 1910. During the Hungarian Soviet Republic (1919) his lands were nationalized. An arrest warrant issued against him in May, and he went into hiding in Somogy County and Zala County. After the fall of the Soviet regime, he was appointed Lord Lieutenant of Somogy County by the government of István Friedrich. He resigned in 1920 from this position.

He became a member of the National Assembly in 1920 with the National Smallholders' Party. After the resignation of István Rakovszky, he was nominated for the post of Speaker of the National Assembly of Hungary. His party merged with the KNEP in 1922, and he joined the newly formed Unity Party. However, he soon quit over the tax measures planned by the cabinet of István Bethlen and became an independent MP.

He and three other representatives founded the Agrarian Party and became a deputy again. His organisation merged into the Independent Smallholders, Agrarian Workers and Civic Party (FKGP) in 1930, becoming its second leader.

== Marriage and children ==
He married Jozefin Cecilia Gabriella Rozália Chernel de Chernelház (January 29, 1880 - June 18, 1908) on January 29, 1898 in Ötvöskónyi. They had three children:

- Olivér Lőrinc Gyula Gaál de Gyula (February 1, 1899 - January 21, 1955) who married Eszter Kacskovics de Daruvár.
- Olga Gaál de Gyula (1900 - July 11, 1915)
- Márta Gaál de Gyula who married Gusztáv Sziberth.

== Death ==
Gaszton Gaál died in Balatonboglár after a short illness.

== Works ==
- Gaál Gaszton: Adalékok a madárvonulás kutatásához (MEK)

Political offices
Preceded by István Rakovszky	Speaker of the National Assembly; 1921–1922	Succeeded by Béla Scitovszky
Party political offices
Preceded by Bálint Szijj	Chairman of the Independent Smallholders' Party; 1931–1932	Succeeded by Tibor Eckhardt
