= Bálint Hóman =

Hungarian scholar and politician

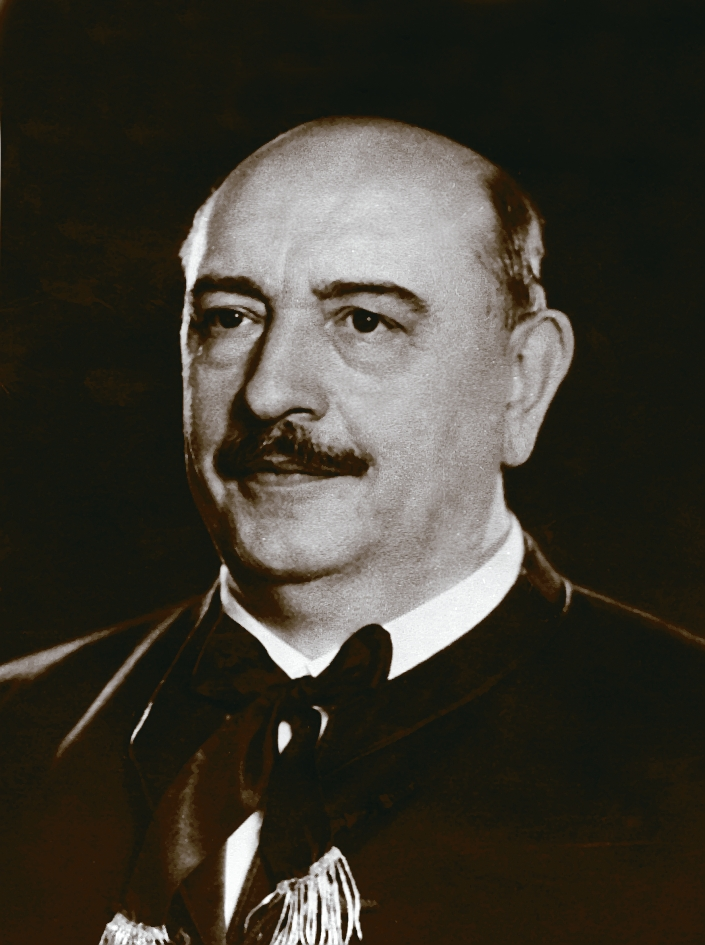

Minister of Religion and Education of Hungary
- In office 1 October 1932 – 14 May 1938
- Prime Minister: Gyula Gömbös; Kálmán Darányi
- Preceded by: Jenő Karafiáth
- Succeeded by: Pál Teleki
- In office 16 February 1939 – 3 July 1942
- Prime Minister: Pál Teleki; László Bárdossy; Miklós Kállay
- Preceded by: Pál Teleki
- Succeeded by: Jenő Szinyei Merse

Member of the House of Representatives
- In office 27 October 1932 – 29 March 1945
- Constituency: Székesfehérvár

Personal details
- Born: 29 December 1885 Budapest, Austria-Hungary
- Died: 2 June 1951 (aged 65) Vác, People's Republic of Hungary
- Party: Party of National Unity, Party of Hungarian Life
- Profession: politician, historian

Bálint Hóman (29 December 1885 – 2 June 1951) was a Hungarian scholar and politician who served as Minister of Religion and Education twice: between 1932 and 1938 and between 1939 and 1942. He died in prison in 1951 for his support of the Nazi invasion of the Soviet Union and antisemitic legislation activity as part of the Axis alliance in World War II.

== Academic career ==
He was born into a Roman Catholic family. He finished his studies in Budapest. He started his career when he was still a student, working for the University Library of Budapest. He was appointed director of the National Széchényi Library in 1922, and of the Hungarian National Museum in 1923, a position he held until 1932.

Hóman produced several serious scholarly works. The centre of his research was the history of the Hungarian nation during the Middle Ages. Initially he dealt with economic history, social history and the auxiliary sciences of history. He wrote about Hungarian towns during the Árpád era, social classes, the first state tax and about the Magyar tribes who migrated to the Carpathian Basin. He authored a massive work entitled History of the Hungarian Currency 1000–1325, in which he systematized the Hungarian currency during the Middle Ages' chronology, metrology and history. His other key solo publication was The Finance, Affairs and Economic Policy of the Kingdom of Hungary During the Reign of Charles Robert.

He published many essays and books together with fellow scholar Gyula Szekfű. Their most prominent work was a well-regarded Hungarian History.

According to Hóman's point of view, it was necessary in this historical analysis to consider the ancient Hungarian words, the Sumerian and Hattian–Hurrian literary monuments.

== Political career ==
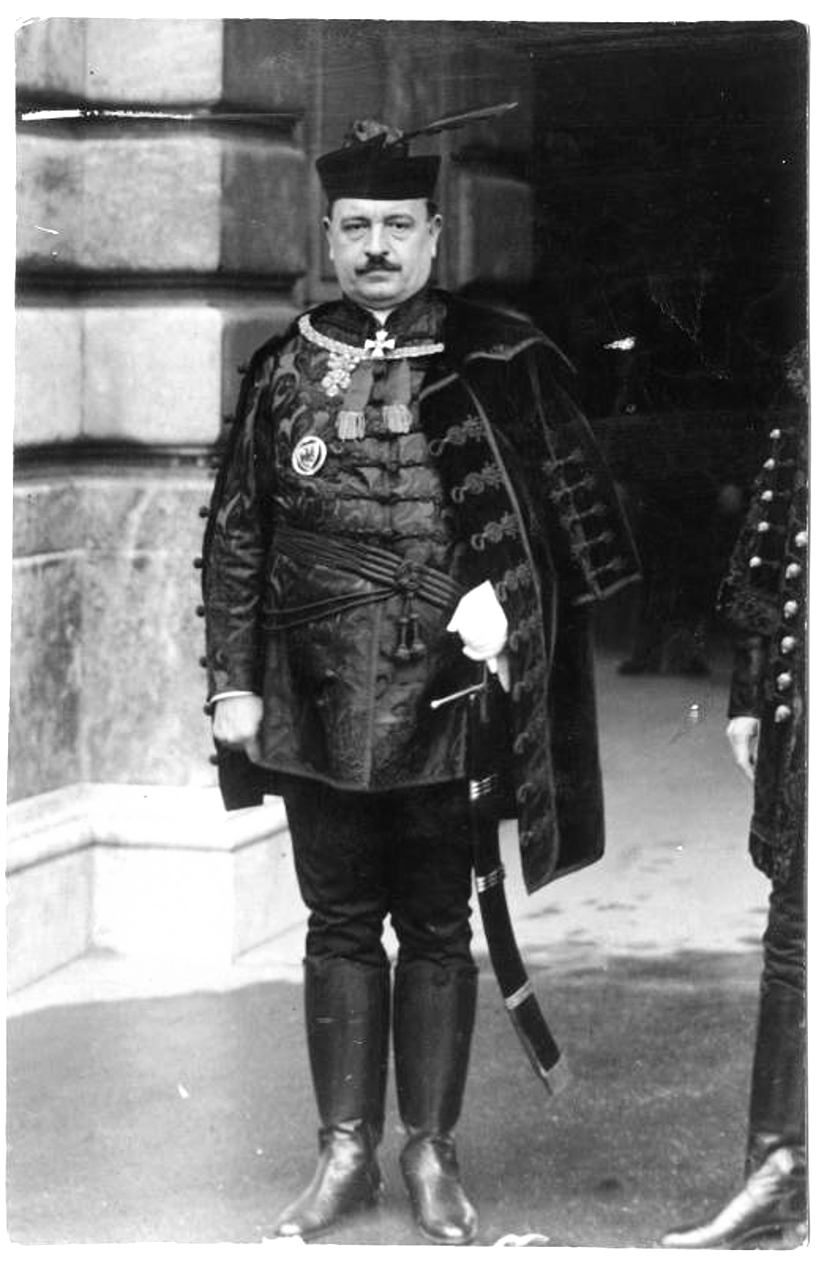
Hóman Bálint in 1932

Hóman rose as part of the increasingly pro-German orientation of Hungarian politics in the 1930s. He served as Minister of Religion and Education in the cabinet of Gyula Gömbös and Kálmán Darányi. After a one-year gap he was again appointed a minister.

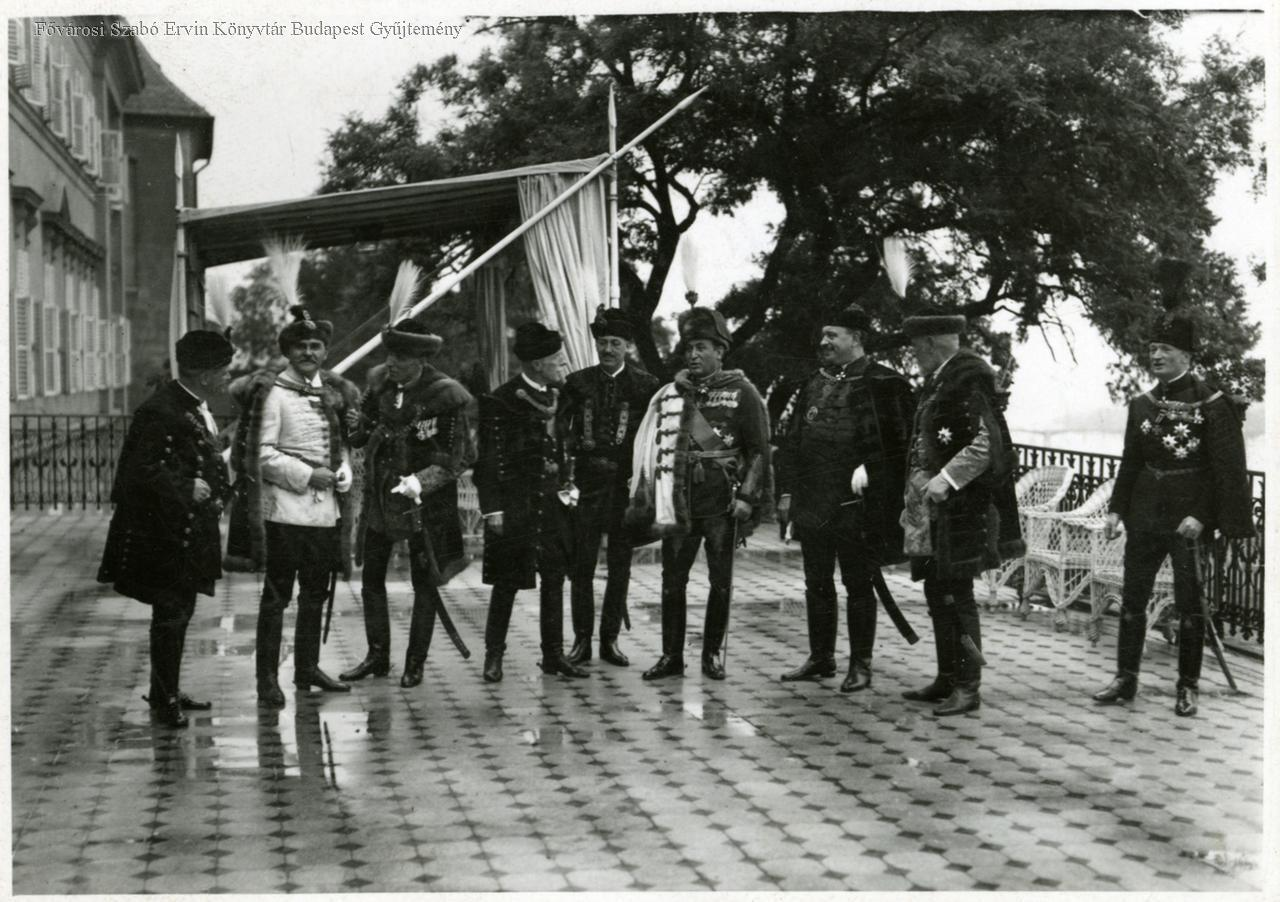
The cabinet of Gyula Gömbös, 1932, dressed in the traditional costumes of Magyar noblemen. Hóman is the man third from the right standing next to Gömbös. Hóman's future rival, Ferenc Keresztes-Fischer is the fourth man from the left. The future prime ministers Miklós Kállay and Béla Imrédy are the men second from the left and third from the left respectively.

Beginning on 11 October 1932, Hungarian universities were rocked by rowdy anti-Semitic demonstrations. Christian university students charged that Jewish students made up a disproportionate number of those studying in violation of the numerus clausus law of 1920, which had imposed a strict 5% quota on the number of Jewish students allowed to study at any one time. The student protestors complained that Jews made only 6% of the population of Hungary, but were 25% of the students at the University of Debrecen and made up 27% of the students at the medical school at Budapest University. The well organised demonstrations took place at every university in Hungary and were a recurring feature of university life until 1936. Gömbös and Hóman came out in support of the demonstrations and met several times in public with the leaders of the protests to declare their support for the demand for a stricter enforcement of the numerus clausus law.

He was the deputy chairman of the Party of National Unity beginning in 1938. In the government, he was a vocal proponent of anti-Jewish actions, and sponsored a law to revoke the status of Hungarian Jewish groups. In 1938-1939, Hóman constantly fought with the Interior Minister Ferenc Keresztes-Fischer over how to apply the First Jewish Law of 1938 to the Hungarian film industry. Hóman wanted to exclude all Jews from the film industry while Keresztes-Fischer argued for exemptions, stating without Jewish businessmen, producers, script-writers, director and actors, the Hungarian film industry would collapse. Keresztes-Fischer mostly won the dispute, and secured the exemptions he wanted. Followoing the bombing of Kassa, Hóman along with the Defense Minister Károly Bartha and the Finance Minister Lajos Reményi-Schneller were the three ministers who called most strongly for the prime minister László Bárdossy to declare war on the Soviet Union. The principle argument that Bartha, Hóman and Reményi-Schneller all made for declaring war were less concerned about the actual bombing, but rather that Romania under Ion Antonescu had joined Operation Barbarossa, and that if Hungary did not join Operatiojn Barbarossa, then Adolf Hitler would favor the Romanian claims to Transylvania over the Hungarian claims.

"He remained opposed to national socialism and did not take an oath of allegiance to Arrow Cross leader Ferenc Szálasi despite his anti-Semitic views. He is also reported to have personally intervened to save a number of Jewish intellectuals and artists from deportation in the spring and summer of 1944."

He opposed the peace negotiations of 1943 with the western allies that would have removed Hungary from the Axis alliance. He chose to remain in the legislature after the German occupation (March 1944) and the coup d'état of the Arrow Cross Party (October 1944). During the brief period of German rule and that of their allies in the Arrow Cross, Hóman co-signed a document with other legislators that called for the expulsion of Hungary's Jews; over a half million were quickly sent to Nazi death camps, including Auschwitz, where most perished. When the Red Army crossed the Hungarian border in December 1944, he fled to Transdanubia along with Arrow Cross Party members (including party leader Ferenc Szálasi). Later he escaped to Germany, but the American troops captured him.

In 1946, the People's Tribunal sentenced Hóman to life imprisonment on war crimes charges, chiefly connected to his vote in the legislature in favor of Hungary's role in the Nazi Germany-led invasion of the USSR. Hóman was imprisoned in Vác, where he sickened quickly after the trials. According to reports, he lost 60 kilograms of body weight during a short time.

== Death and legacy ==
Hóman died in prison on 2 June 1951.

On 6 March 2015 Hóman was rehabilitated after a ruling by the Metropolitan Court of Budapest, which found that the original trial had inadequate evidence.

A private foundation proposed building a life-size bronze statue of Hóman in Székesfehérvár. European Jewish Congress President Moshe Kantor condemned the project as "a shocking display of insensitivity towards the Jewish people", and US and other diplomats joined a rally against the statue. The US government urged Hungarian officials to block what press reports termed the 'anti-Semitic' statue, pointing out that government funds were being used to pay part of its costs. After protests by the Jewish community, city government voted to scrap plans for the statue.

== Publications ==
- A magyar városok az Árpádok korában [Hungarian towns during the Árpád era] (Budapest, 1908)
- Magyar pénztörténet 1000–1325 [History of the Hungarian Currency 1000–1325] (Budapest, 1916)
- A magyar királyság pénzügyei és gazdaságpolitikája Károly Róbert korában [The finance affairs and economic policy of the Kingdom of Hungary during the reign of Charles Robert] (Budapest, 1921)
- A Szent László-kori Gesta Ungarorum és a XII–XIII. századi leszármazói [The Saint Ladislaus aged Gesta Hungarorum and its ancestors of the 12th–13th century] (Budapest, 1925)
- A magyar hun hagyomány és hun monda [The Hungarian Hunnic tradition and Hunnic legend] (Budapest, 1925)
- A forráskutatás és forráskritika története [History of the source research and source criticism] (Budapest, 1925)
- Magyar történet [Hungarian History] (1458-ig, a továbbiakat Szekfű Gyula írta; Budapest, é. n. )
- Egyetemes történet [World history] (I–IV. Szerk.: H. B., Szekfű Gyula, Kerényi Károly; Budapest, 1935–1937)
- Ősemberek – Ősmagyarok [Prehistoric men – Prehistoric Hungarians] (Atlanta, 1985)
- A történelem útja. Válogatott tanulmányok [The way of the history. Selected studies] (Vál.: Buza János; Budapest, 2002)

== Books and Articles ==
- Magyar Életrajzi Lexikon
- Cornelius, Deborah S (2011). Hungary in World War II: Caught in the Cauldron. New York: Fordham University Press. ISBN 978-0823233441.
- Frey, David (2017). Jews, Nazis and the Cinema of Hungary The Tragedy of Success, 1929-1944. London: Bloomsbury Publishing. ISBN 9781786730619.
- Klein, Bernard (Spring 1982). "Anti-Jewish Demonstrations in Hungarian Universities, 1932-1936: István Bethlen vs Gyula Gömbös". Jewish Social Studies. 44 (2): 112–124.

Political offices
Preceded by Jenő Karafiáth	Minister of Religion and Education; 1932–1938	Succeeded by Pál Teleki
Preceded by Pál Teleki	Minister of Religion and Education; 1939–1942	Succeeded by Jenő Szinyei Merse
