= Battle of Budaörs =

1921 armed clash between government and loyalist forces in Hungary

Battle of Budaörs Budaörsi csata
- Part of Charles I of Austria's attempts to retake the throne of Hungary
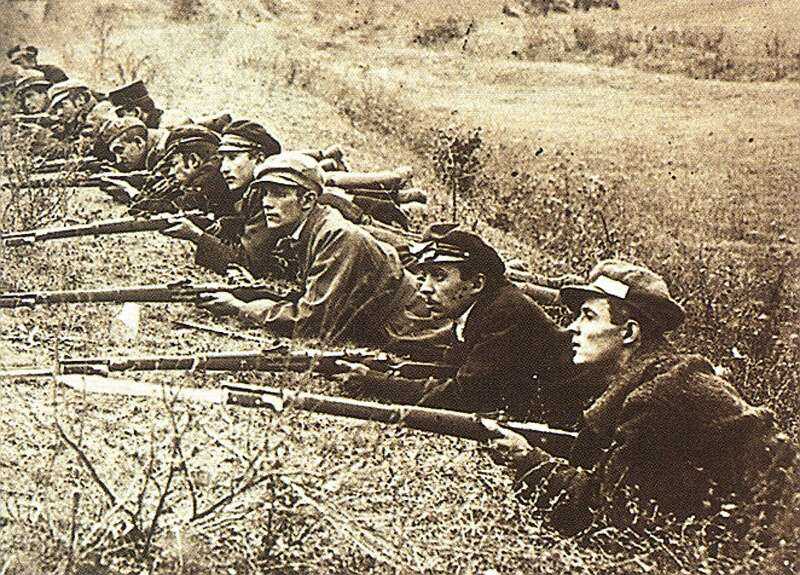
- University students on the battlefield
Date	23–24 October 1921
Location	Budaörs, Kingdom of Hungary
Result	Regentist victory: Charles IV expelled from Hungary

Belligerents
Loyalist volunteer militias	Regentist forces

Commanders and leaders
Charles IV of Hungary; Gyula Ostenburg-Moravek; Antal Lehár	Miklós Horthy; Pál Nagy; Gyula Gömbös

Strength
2,000, mainly loyalist soldiers of Ostenburg-Moravek and some local garrison forces	6,000, initially volunteer forces including some 400 university students

Casualties and losses
Unknown, at least 14?	19 dead, 62 wounded

The Battle of Budaörs was a minor armed clash on 23–24 October 1921 between the governmental forces of the Kingdom of Hungary and the loyalist forces of Charles IV of Hungary, who tried to reclaim the throne of Hungary after his resignation in 1918.

In the first section of the fight, the loyalist forces led by Gyula Ostenburg-Moravek captured the city as well as the near village of Budafok, but later in the late evening, the governmental forces' counterattack successfully surrounded the attackers, and disarmed them, later capturing Charles himself on 25 October in Tata, forcing him to give up his claims. Following the victory, the government led by István Bethlen officially stated the dethroning of the Habsburg dynasty.

== Background ==
After the Treaty of Trianon, seeing the political instability in both Hungary and Austria, Charles wanted to restore his reign on his former subject countries. Without warning his supporters, he appeared in Hungary on 27 March 1921. Being a peaceful politician, he wanted to discuss his return with the actual leaders of Hungary, Prime Minister Pál Teleki - a loyalist himself - and Regent Miklós Horthy. This time, Horthy was able to convince Charles that the Little Entente wouldn't tolerate the restoration of the Habsburg dynasty and that the country would end up in a military intervention. Charles left the country on 5 April, when Horthy ordered Antal Lehár to bring him back on the border.

After this, Charles' trust in Horthy was gone, and he started to plan a military coup to regain his former position. He returned in mid-October, when, as a result of the Uprising in West Hungary, a large amount of loyalist military person was shown up in the western part of the country, but after the Referendum of Sopron, he had to hurry up before the disbanding and homecoming of these people. On 20 October, he crossed the border, and started to recruit soldiers. On 22 October, a train full of soldiers departed towards Budapest. After the warning of the Little Entente states of an upcoming military intervention if Charles won't be stopped, Horthy ordered armed resistance. Charles' slowness significantly helped him: he stopped in every major city, taking the greetings, and the soldiers' oath. It is believed that Charles' only goal with the military was to make pressure on Horthy, but he wanted to avoid any kind of fight.

When arriving at midnight in Tata, Charles sent Lt. General Pál Hegedűs to Budapest, to convince the city commander, Pál Nagy of changing sides, that way he could have avoided any bloodshed, and could have marched easily in the city. Hegedűs was sent to Horthy first, then to the new Prime Minister, István Bethlen. Finally, High Representative of the United Kingdom, Thomas Hohler told him that Hungary doesn't recognize Charles as the legitimate ruler of Hungary. After that, Gyula Ostenburg-Moravek, leader of the troops decided to fight. They marched under Budaörs, where they arrived in the early hours.

== Battle ==
The governmental forces were mainly formed by university students recruited rapidly by Gyula Gömbös the day before. This was a desperate decision from Gömbös, as he couldn't rely neither on the hesitating army, nor on any paramilitary units, and even his personal group, the MOVE refused to fight. While being strongly motivated, the students had no commanders, therefore they had to organize themselves on their own.

The first fight took place on the field called Törökugrató (Turk Jumper). The troops of Ostenburg-Moravek encountered 80 medical students, who opened fire on the incoming train. The soldiers on the train quickly occupied the field, but not knowing that the only opposing forces were students, the attack stopped, waiting for further command from Charles. However, he didn't wanted any bloodshed, therefore he waited and attended a holy mass in Bicske, waiting for Lt. General Hegedűs with the news, in the faith that the city is free for him to go.

Charles' hesitation was fatal. The government managed to bring reinforcements. The first troops appeared at 11 am, who got a rousing speech from Horthy himself. They started a counterattack at afternoon, and they managed to reconquer the Törökugrató field.

Following these events, both parties agreed in a ceasefire, but the happenings before already shown which party is more decided. Charles' soldiers started to desert, while Horthy continued uniting his troops. Next morning, negotiations were started, but Charles denied to resign voluntarily, therefore the parties reopened fire. Hearing about this, Charles ordered retreat, but the troops of Ostenburg-Moravek were surrounded and captured.

The governmental forces officially had 19 deaths and 62 injured. The loyalist casualties are unknown: the victims were buried in unmarked graves.

== Aftermath ==
The defeat had serious consequences for Charles: his supporters did not trusted him anymore. The soldiers of the western counties oathed to Horthy again, and prevented Charles from leaving the country. He was arrested, and led to the Tihany Abbey. However, the closing of the case couldn't wait anymore: Edvard Beneš wanted to use the failed coup for his anti-Hungarian campaign. He tried to start a second occupation against Hungary with the Little Entente: his plans surprisingly were supported solely by Yugoslavia, while Romania remained steady over the case.

This campaign forced the government to get rid of Charles as soon as possible. The Entente made the island of Madeira as his place of residence. He died there on 1 April 1922 from the Spanish flu.

The student troops later formed the Turul Alliance, which became Hungary's largest student organization in five years.
