= Lehár (surname) =

Lehár is a surname. Notable people with the surname include:

- Anton Lehár (1867–1962), Hungarian-Austrian officer, brother of Franz
- Franz Lehár (1870–1948), Hungarian-Austrian composer
