= Béla Scitovszky =

Hungarian politician

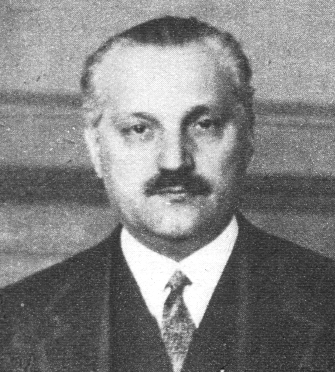

Minister of the Interior of Hungary
- In office 15 October 1926 – 24 August 1931
- Prime Minister: István Bethlen
- Preceded by: Iván Rakovszky
- Succeeded by: Ferenc Keresztes-Fischer

Personal details
- Born: 23 April 1878 Budapest, Austria-Hungary
- Died: 20 August 1959 (aged 81) Budapest, Hungary
- Party: KNEP, Unity Party
- Profession: politician

Béla Scitovszky de Nagykér (23 April 1878 – 20 August 1959) was a Hungarian politician, who served as Interior Minister between 1926 and 1931. He was the Speaker of the National Assembly of Hungary between 1922 and 1926.

Political offices
Preceded by Gaszton Gaál	Speaker of the National Assembly; 1922–1926	Succeeded by Tibor Zsitvay
Preceded by Iván Rakovszky	Minister of the Interior; 1926–1931	Succeeded by Ferenc Keresztes-Fischer
