= Kuno von Klebelsberg =

Hungarian politician (1875–1932)

Count Kuno Klebelsberg de Thumburg
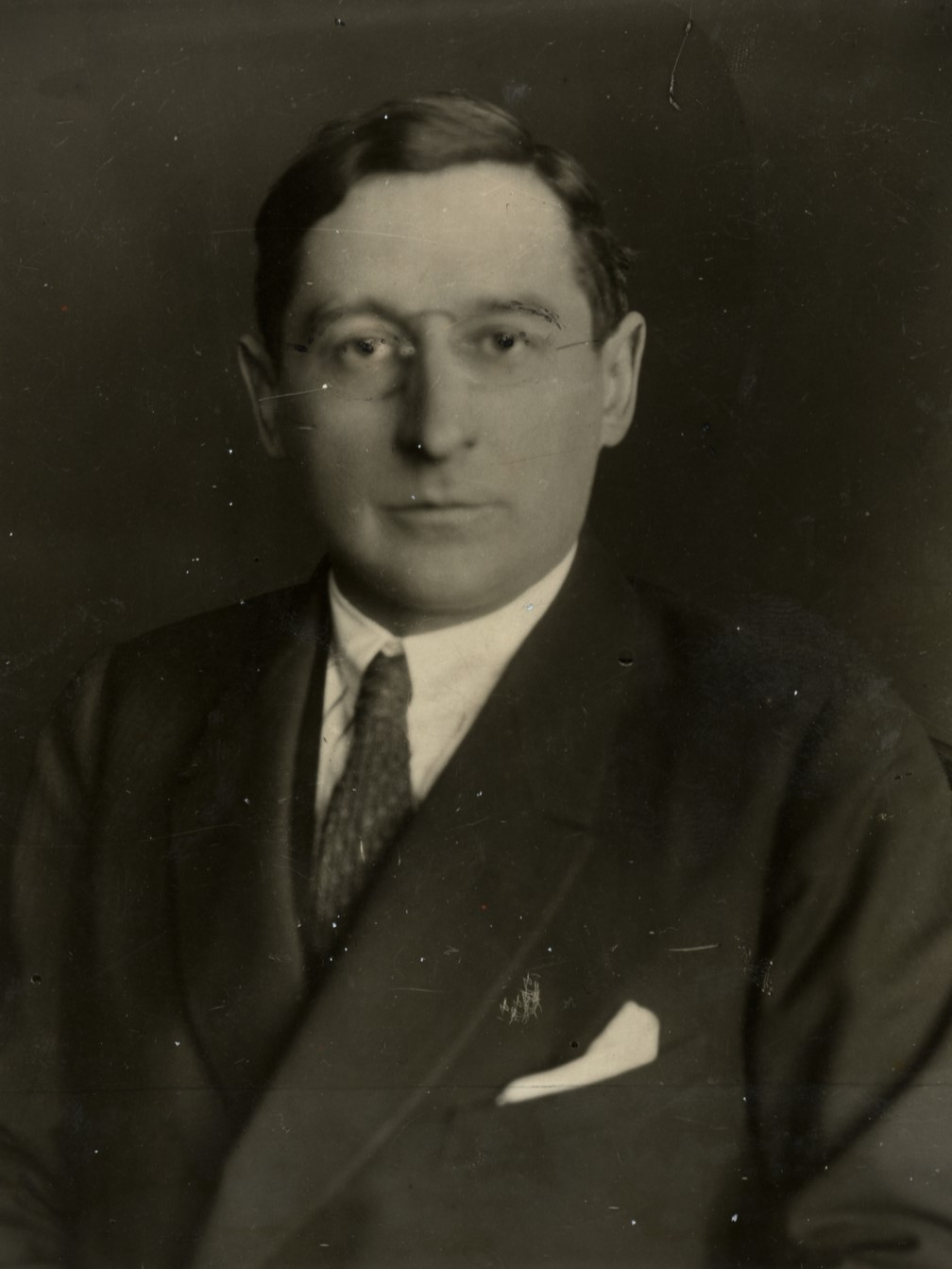
- Klebelsberg in 1920

Minister of the Interior of Hungary
- In office 3 December 1921 – 6 June 1922
- Prime Minister: István Bethlen
- Preceded by: Gedeon Ráday
- Succeeded by: Iván Rakovszky

Minister of Religion and Education
- In office 16 January 1922 – 24 August 1931
- Prime Minister: István Bethlen
- Preceded by: József Vass
- Succeeded by: Sándor Ernszt

Personal details
- Born: 13 November 1875 Pécska, Kingdom of Hungary, Austria-Hungary (today Pecica, Romania)
- Died: 12 October 1932 Budapest, Hungary
- Party: National Party of Work (1913–1918); Christian National Party (1919–1920); Independent (1920–1922); Unity Party (1922–1932)
- Spouse: Sarolta Botka
- Profession: Politician; jurist

Count Kuno von Klebelsberg zu Thumburg (Hungarian: Gróf thumburgi Klebelsberg Kuno Imre Aurél Ferenc; 13 November 1875 – 12 October 1932) was a Hungarian politician who served as Minister of the Interior and Minister of Culture of the Kingdom of Hungary between the two world wars.

== Early life ==
Klebelsberg was born in Magyarpécska, Austria-Hungary (today Pecica, Romania), as the only son of Count Jakob Joseph Konstantin von Klebelsberg-Thumburg (1844–1877) and his wife, Aurelia Karolina Farkas de Felső- et Alsó-Eőr (1847–1897).

== Biography ==
After World War I, the Treaty of Trianon, and the ravages of the civil war, Klebelsberg assumed the position of Minister of the Interior in 1921, a post which he filled until the following year. Afterwards, he served as Minister of Culture (1922–1931) and introduced many educational reforms throughout Hungary. Klebelsberg helped create elementary schools in the countryside, began the modernisation of numerous universities, and created the foreign Hungarian cultural institute Collegium Hungaricum to raise awareness of Hungarian culture in other countries.

Klebelsberg is also famous for introducing a progressive policy on scholarships for university students.

Klebelsberg, however, was controversial with his ideology of Hungarian supremacy, which attributed superior value to Hungarian ethnic culture over the minority ethnic cultures of the former Austro-Hungarian Monarchy (Serb, Slovak, Romanian, Jewish etc.). After the Treaty of Trianon, Klebelsberg's ideology and educational reforms directly served the territorial revisionist and chauvinistic claims of the Hungarian regimes during Miklós Horthy's reign as a regent. Klebelsberg was antisemitic, blaming the entire Hungarian Jewry for the bourgeois liberal and communist revolutions, and the governments of 1918 and 1919, respectively, for the loss of territories associated with the Treaty of Trianon. In a dramatic outburst in 1924, he asked the Jews to give back Greater Hungary, promising in exchange to lift the numerus clausus, the first anti-Jewish act introduced in 20th century Europe.

== Personal life ==
He was married to Hungarian noblewoman Sarolta Ottilia Botka de Lasztócz (1878–1964), daughter of Géza Bottka de Lasztócz (1848–1880) and his wife, Marta Hekler (1854–1934). They didn't have children.

Political offices
Preceded by Gedeon Ráday	Minister of the Interior; 1921–1922	Succeeded by Iván Rakovszky
Preceded by József Vass	Minister of Religion and Education; 1922–1931	Succeeded by Sándor Ernszt
