= Sándor Ernszt =

Hungarian politician

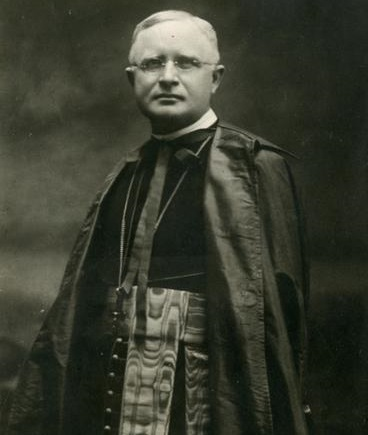

Minister of Religion and Education of Hungary
- In office 24 August 1931 – 16 December 1931
- Prime Minister: Gyula Károlyi
- Preceded by: Kunó Klebelsberg
- Succeeded by: Jenő Karafiáth

Personal details
- Born: 21 April 1870 Galgóc, Austria-Hungary
- Died: 19 November 1938 (aged 68) Budapest, Kingdom of Hungary
- Party: Catholic People's Party, KGSZP, KNEP
- Profession: politician

Sándor Ernszt (21 April 1870 – 19 November 1938) was a Hungarian politician, who served as Minister of Religion and Education in 1931. He also served as Minister of Welfare and Labour from 1930.

Political offices
Preceded by Kunó Klebelsberg	Minister of Religion and Education; 1931	Succeeded by Jenő Karafiáth
