= Pénzintézeti Központ =

Former Hungarian public institution

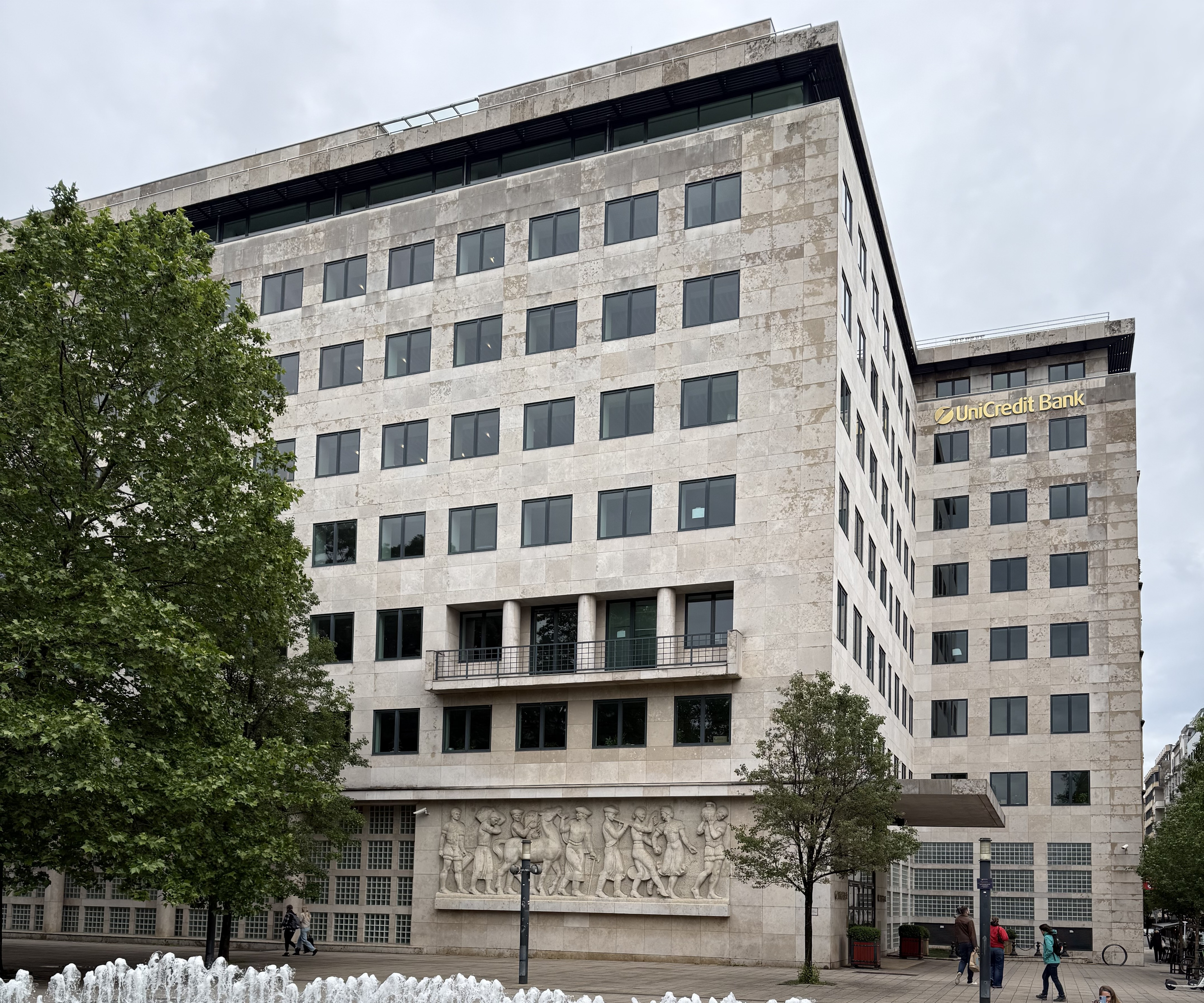
Former head office of the Pénzintézeti Központ on Liberty Square (Budapest)

The Pénzintézeti Központ (lit. 'Financial Institution Center', PK) was a public agency in Hungary, based in Budapest. It combined a role of bank supervisor with resources to provide temporary liquidity to struggling but solvent banks. As an early bank supervisor, it had common features with the supervisory role of the Swedish finance ministry (est. 1824) and the U.S. Office of the Comptroller of the Currency (est. 1863).

== Background ==
Organizations were set up in Hungary to represent, oversee and strengthen the various segments of the kingdom's banking sector, first for savings banks in 1892 (Magyar Takarékpénztárak Központi Jelzálogbankja, lit. 'Central Mortgage Bank of the Hungarian Savings Banks'), then cooperative banks in 1898 (Országos Központi Hitelszövetkezet, lit. 'National Central Credit Union'), then eventually for commercial banks in 1903 with two rival bodies (Magyarországi Pénzintézetek Országos Szövetsége or MPOSZ, lit. 'National Association of Hungarian Financial Institutions'; Pénzintézetek Országos Egyesülete or POE, lit. 'National Association of Financial Institutions'). In the early 20th century, a number of local savings banks failed, and the large Budapest-based banks became increasingly complex and intertwined with industrial interests.

== Creation and interwar development ==
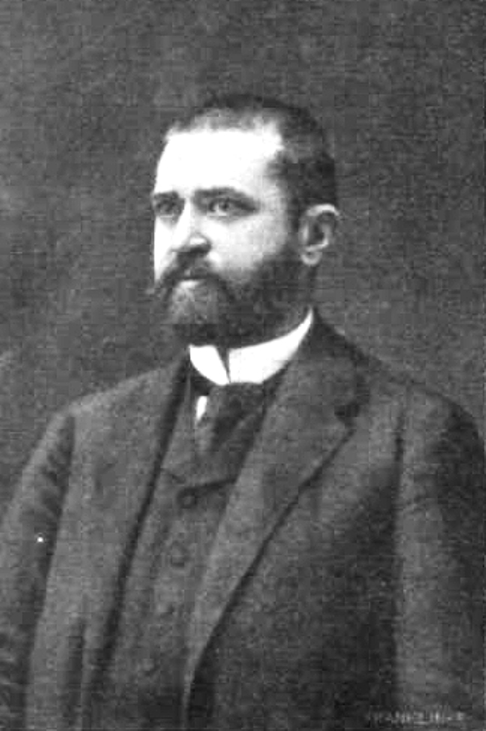
János Teleszky (1868-1939) was instrumental in the establishment of the Pénzintézeti Központ

Draft legislation to create a central bank financing and supervisory body was published in March 1915 amid wartime debates about structural financial reform. The Pénzintézeti Központ was intended to provide funding to smaller banks, with a capacity to inspect and audit them to check their creditworthiness. The new body was formally established on 1 June 1916, with active support from prime minister István Tisza and finance minister János Teleszky, initially for a fixed period of five years. Cooperatives that were already audited by the National Central Credit Union were exempted from inspections by the Pénzintézeti Központ to avoid duplication. Out of 1,871 Hungarian credit institutions operating as limited companies at the time, 1,261 voluntarily joined the PK framework, including some larger banks that had declined to join the MPOSZ. Teleszky commented with reference to PK that "an institution that [...] combines the roles of the inspector and controller with those of the supporter and provider of credit, and that not only identifies problems but can also help right away can be found nowhere else."

In 1938-1940, the Pénzintézeti Központ had a new head office building erected for itself on the corner of Liberty Square in central Budapest, across the street from the Hungarian National Bank (MNB). It moved there in 1940 from its previous location at the Queen of England Hotel on 1, Ferenc Deák street. The building was designed jointly by architects László Lauber and István Nyiri in 1937, with a monumental exterior relief by sculptor Ferenc Medgyessy representing Harvesters. The building subsequently hosted the Hungarian Ministry of Metallurgy and Mechanical Engineering and later the Hungarian Credit Bank (est. 1987), the MNB's foreign exchange department, Magyar Televízió, then was acquired by Bank Austria for its Hungarian affiliate and has lately been the home of the latter's successor UniCredit Bank Hungary.

== Communist era and aftermath ==
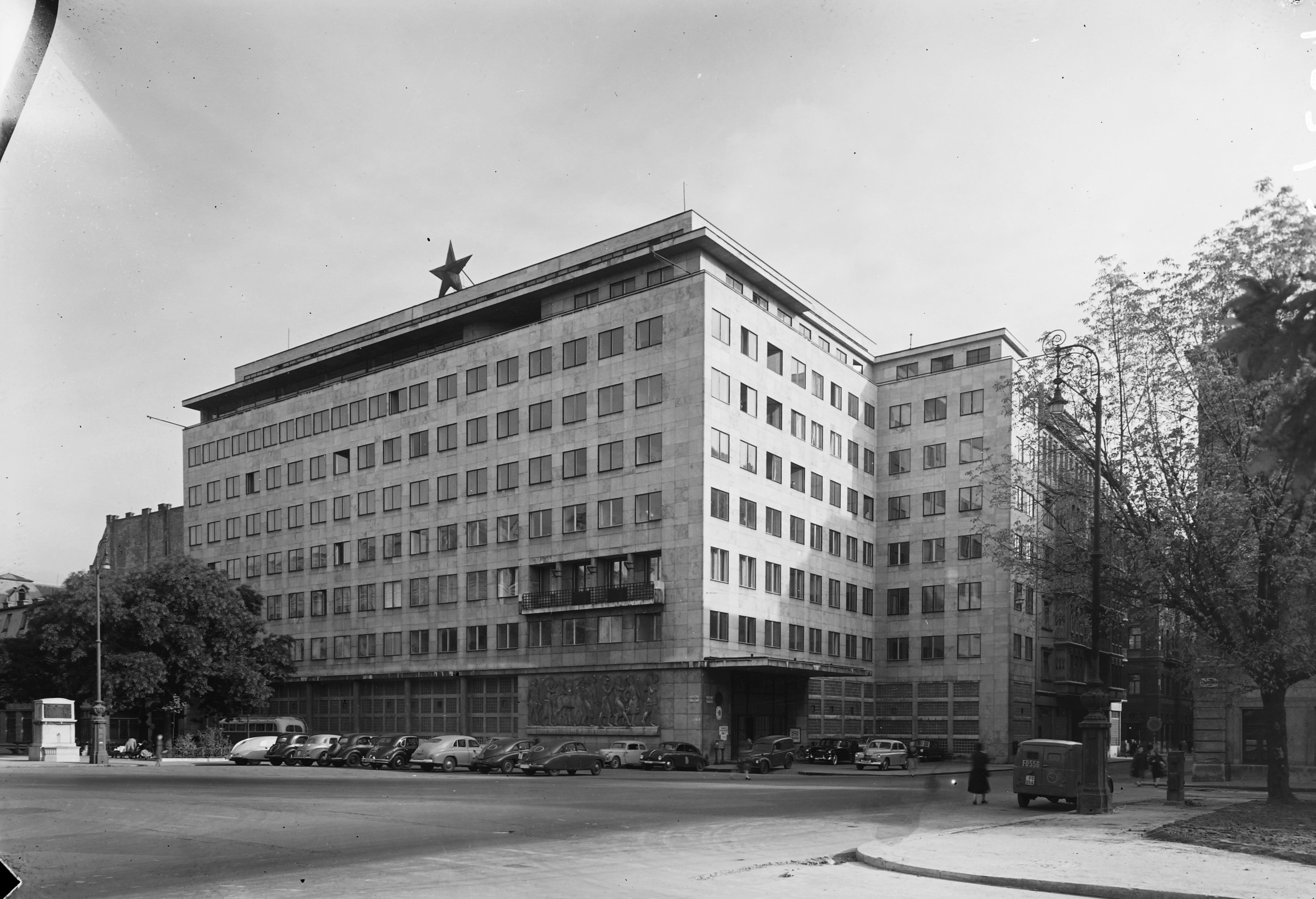
The former PK building as home of the Ministry of Metallurgy and Mechanical Engineering, 1954

Following the Communist takeover of Hungary in 1947, the new authorities nationalized the banking sector but preserved the legal entities of the former commercial banks to mitigate legal risks linked to residual foreign ownership. By the 1980s, the Pénzintézeti Központ held those so-called "bank stubs" as well as assets linked to various international transactions. In 1992, the Pénzintézeti Központ was reorganized as a joint-stock company, and obtained a banking license in 1995. It went on to operate as PK Bank. In 1997, PK Bank was acquired by Postabank, which absorbed its banking operations in 2001. After some financial distress, Postabank in turn was absorbed by Erste Group in 2003.

== Leadership ==
- József Schmidt (1916-1926)
- Frigyes Korányi (1928-1931)
- Gyula Posch (1935-1943)
- Bertalan Bodor (1944-1945)
- Dezső Sulyok (1945-1947)
- János Gyöngyösi (1947-1951)

== See also ==
- List of banks in Hungary
