= Jenő Karafiáth =

Hungarian politician

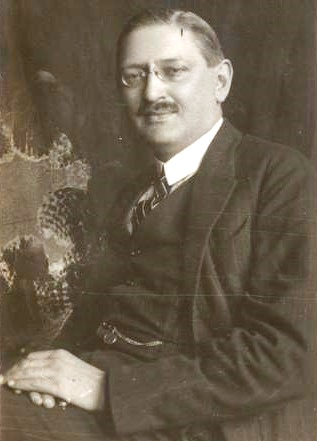

Minister of Religion and Education of Hungary
- In office 16 December 1931 – 1 October 1932
- Prime Minister: Gyula Károlyi
- Preceded by: Sándor Ernszt
- Succeeded by: Bálint Hóman

Personal details
- Born: 31 July 1883 Budapest, Austria-Hungary
- Died: 26 May 1952 (aged 68) Budapest, People's Republic of Hungary
- Party: Conservative Party
- Profession: politician

Jenő Karafiáth (31 July 1883 – 26 May 1952) was a Hungarian politician, who served as Minister of Religion and Education between 1931 and 1932. He was the chairman of the Hungarian Tourist Association from 1920. He served as Lord Mayor of Budapest from 1937 to 1942. His hobby was the poetry, he published several poems to the newspaper of Új idők.

Political offices
Preceded by Sándor Ernszt	Minister of Religion and Education; 1931–1932	Succeeded by Bálint Hóman
