= János Teleszky =

Hungarian politician

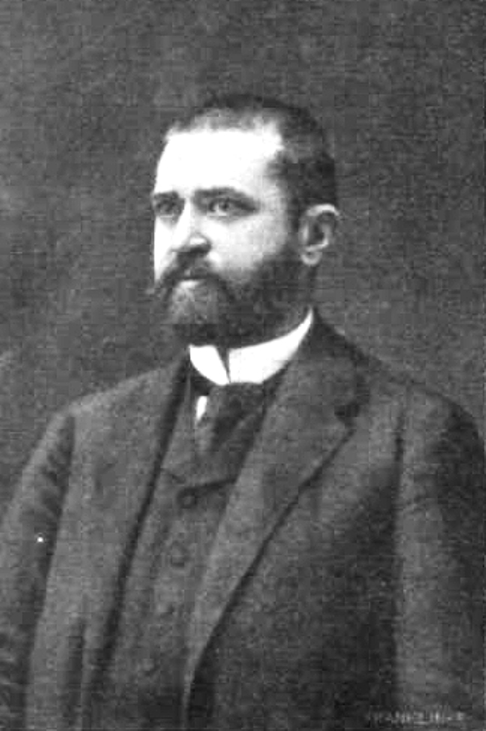

Minister of Finance of Hungary
- In office 22 April 1912 – 15 June 1917
- Preceded by: László Lukács
- Succeeded by: Gusztáv Gratz

Personal details
- Born: 15 September 1868 Nagyvárad, Austria-Hungary (now Oradea, Romania)
- Died: 13 June 1939 (aged 70) Budapest, Kingdom of Hungary
- Party: Party of National Work
- Profession: politician, economist

János Teleszky (15 September 1868 – 13 June 1939) was a Hungarian politician, who served as Minister of Finance between 1912 and 1917. He was full member of the Hungarian Academy of Sciences. After the First World War he served as chairman of the National Financial Council. The creating of the superannuation act and formation of the Pénzintézeti Központ are connected his name.

Political offices
Preceded by László Lukács	Minister of Finance; 1912–1917	Succeeded by Gusztáv Gratz
