= Gusztáv Gratz =

Hungarian politician

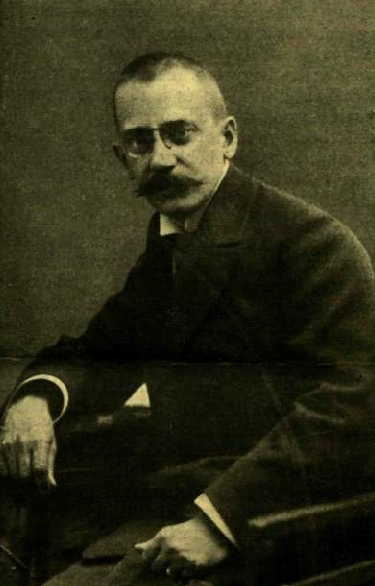

Minister of Foreign Affairs of Hungary
- In office 17 January 1921 – 12 April 1921
- Prime Minister: Pál Teleki
- Preceded by: Pál Teleki
- Succeeded by: Pál Teleki

Personal details
- Born: 30 March 1875 Gölnicbánya, Szepes County, Kingdom of Hungary, Austria-Hungary
- Died: 21 November 1946 (aged 71) Budapest, Hungary
- Party: Constitution Party, Party of National Work, Independent
- Profession: politician

Gusztáv Gratz (30 March 1875 in Gölnicbánya – 21 November 1946 in Budapest) was a Hungarian politician, who served as Minister of Foreign Affairs in 1921. He was a correspondent member of the Hungarian Academy of Sciences. Gratz published in the Huszadik Század and the Társadalomtudományi Társaság newspapers. He was a representative in the National Assembly from 1906. He also served as managing director of the National Association of Manufacturers (GYOSZ). In 1917 he was appointed Minister of Finance in Móric Esterházy's cabinet. He took part in the peace negotiations' economical parts during the Treaty of Brest-Litovsk and Treaty of Bucharest.

From 22 November 1919 he was the Hungarian ambassador to Austria. After he served as Minister of Foreign Affairs until Charles I of Austria's attempts to retake the throne of Hungary. As legitimist politician Gratz participated in the planning of the second coup. That's why he was imprisoned for a short time. Gratz pursued a journalism, historian's and economic activity then.

== Biography ==
He was born in a Hungarian and German-speaking German Protestant pastor's family who had moved from northwest Hungary in the Zips, attended the Saxon School in Igló, then, after his father accepted the invitation of the Kolozsvár (Cluj) Protestant community, and the family moved to Kolozsvár, the Unitarian Upper School in Kolozsvár, for one year, and the Saxon School in Beszterce. After graduation he studied law at the Universities of Kolozsvár and Budapest and completed his studies in 1898.

From 1896 he was an employee of the Pester Lloyd, a correspondent of the Cologne Gazette from 1898, while Budapest Rapporteur of the Vienna newspaper Die Zeit in 1906, he joined the Neue Freie Presse. In 1900 he co-founded the magazine Huszadik Század (Twentieth Century), for which he drew up in 1903 as editor. Gratz, founded in 1901 and his peers the Társadalomtudományi Társaság (Sociological Society). The journal and the society set themselves the goal of eliminating the backward social conditions in Hungary and to advocate for agricultural reform and to the spread of the franchise. But soon differences arose between the conservative and radical elements. 1903 Gratz came from the editorial board from 1906 and broke with the radical circle of the Society for Sociology. In 1906 he acquired the parliamentary seat of the constituency Újegyház in Transylvania, and was until the collapse in 1918, worked in the group of deputies of the Transylvanian Saxons.

From 1912 he held the post of executive director of the National Association of Hungarian Industrialists (Országos Gyáriparosok Szövetsége). During the First World War he was a member of several central economic war. As a liberal economist, he sat down firmly committed to the idea of an economic alliance between the German Reich and the Austro-Hungarian Monarchy. In 1917 Gratz was appointed chief of the trade section in the Common Foreign Ministry. From June to September 1917 he held the office of the Hungarian Finance Minister, in turn, he served as section chief of the monarchy from the trade negotiations at Brest-Litovsk and Bucharest, which won him great political prestige. After the October Revolution of 1918 in Hungary, he went to Vienna and joined the Hungarian anti-Bolshevik Committee.

From November 1919 to January 1921 he was the Hungarian ambassador in Vienna, after which he took until April 1921 the post of Hungarian foreign minister. He advocated the restoration of the Habsburg monarchy and the cooperation of the successor states of Austria-Hungary. As a staunch Legitimist 1921 he took on two unsuccessful attempts of Charles I return as an active part as the Emperor of Austria and King Charles IV of Hungary, so he was arrested after the king had to leave the country forever. Although it was after ten weeks in prison again set free, and it was brought against the participants in the restoration trial process for the crime of rebellion never came to a verdict, the unfortunate outcome of the second return attempt of King Charles disruption meant in his political career. Connection to the political and public life he had not lost even after that, he regularly wrote editorials for the Pester Lloyd and took part in the work of the International Chamber of Commerce. He worked for several industrial enterprises that were interested in Hungarian.

From the mid-1920s on, he was chairman or board member of more than 40 banks and industrial companies. In 1924 he became chairman of the German Adult Education Association Ungarländischen (UDV), where he remained until 1938. Executive Vice President of the UDV was Jakab Bleyer, the real guiding spirit of the Germans in Hungary, but did not have the confidence of the Hungarian government. The election as President of Gratz was regarded as his political rehabilitation.

The association depended entirely upon the Hungarian government. He viewed his task at the head of the association in the mediation between the government and the German minority in Hungary. In this sense, he came for mother tongue teaching and the educational possibilities of the German minority in Hungary, was at war but any attempt by the Germans in Hungary and political organization, which from the mid-1930s to harsh contrasts between him and the Volkstumsgedanken heated young generation led. When the Hungarian government in 1938 the ethnic German direction with the approval of the National Association of Germans in Hungary was acceptable, he resigned from the top of the UDV. From 1926 he was deputy who initially friendly to the government, then from 1936 with a mandate of the Civil Freedom Party. He complained in the House of Representatives and his articles in the anti-liberal and anti-democratic tendencies of his time. In June 1939 he became chief editor of the liberal daily paper Pesti Napló. In the last years of the war he was a secret commission to make preparations for the future peace conference, be consulted. In April 1944 (after the occupation of Hungary by the Third Reich in March 1944) he was deported by the Gestapo to a concentration camp Mauthausen. After his release in July 1944, he lived first in one of his daughters in Sulz in Vienna, then in Budapest.

From 1925 he edited the Hungarian Economic Yearbook, which provided information on the situation of the Hungarian economy, but also brought a historical and political contributions. It appeared in 1939 in abridged form in English (The Hungarian Economic Yearbook). In three volumes, appeared his great historical work of 1934–35, in which he – Fabricated history of dualism and the revolutions from 1918 to 1920 – mostly political. The fourth volume, which deals with the inter-war period, has been published only in 2001. In recognition of his journalistic activities and history chose him in 1941 the Hungarian Academy of Sciences as a corresponding member.

== Publications ==
- Nemzetközi jog (Völkerrecht). Budapest, 1899.
- Alkotmánypolitika (Verfassungspolitik). Budapest-Pozsony, 1900.
- Az általános választójog és Tisza István gróf. (Das allgemeine Wahlrecht und Graf Stefan Tisza). Budapest, 1905.
- Általános választójog és nemzeti politika (Allgemeines Wahlrecht und nationale Politik). Budapest, 1905.
- Az általános választójog szociológiai szempontból (Das allgemeine Wahlrecht in soziologischer Hinsicht). Budapest, 1906.
- A bolsevizmus Magyarországon (Der Bolschewismus in Ungarn). (Hrsg. und Einf. von Gustav Gratz). Budapest, 1921.
- Politikai és gazdasági liberalizmus (Politischer und wirtschaftlicher Liberalismus) Budapest, 1922.
- Die Äussere Wirtschaftspolitik Österreich-Ungarns. Mitteleuropäische Pläne. (zusammen mit Richard Schüller). Vienna – New Haven, 1925.
- Európai külpolitika (Europäische Außenpolitik). Budapest, 1929.
- Der wirtschaftliche Zusammenbruch Österreich-Ungarns. Die Tragödie der Erschöpfung (zusammen mit Richard Schüller). Vienna – New Haven 1930.
- Zur Frage der Deutsch-Österreichischen Zollunion. Budapest, 1931.
- A dualizmus kora. Magyarország története 1867–1918 I-II. (Die Zeit des Dualismus I.-II. Geschichte Ungarns 1967–1918). Budapest 1934.
- A forradalmak kora. Magyarország története 1918–1920 (Die Zeit der Revolutionen. Geschichte Ungarns 1918–1920). Budapest 1935.
- Deutschungarische Probleme. Budapest 1938.
- Magyarország a két háború között (Ungarn zwischen den beiden Kriegen). Budapest 2001.
- Augenzeuge dreier Epochen. Die Memoiren des ungarischen Außenministers Gustav Gratz 1875–1945. Herausgegeben von Vince Paál und Gerhard Seewann. (Südosteuropäische Arbeiten 137) Münich 2009, Verlag Oldenbourg.

Political offices
Preceded by János Teleszky	Minister of Finance; 1917	Succeeded by Sándor Wekerle
Preceded by Pál Teleki	Minister of Foreign Affairs; 1921	Succeeded by Pál Teleki
