= Iván Rakovszky =

Hungarian politician

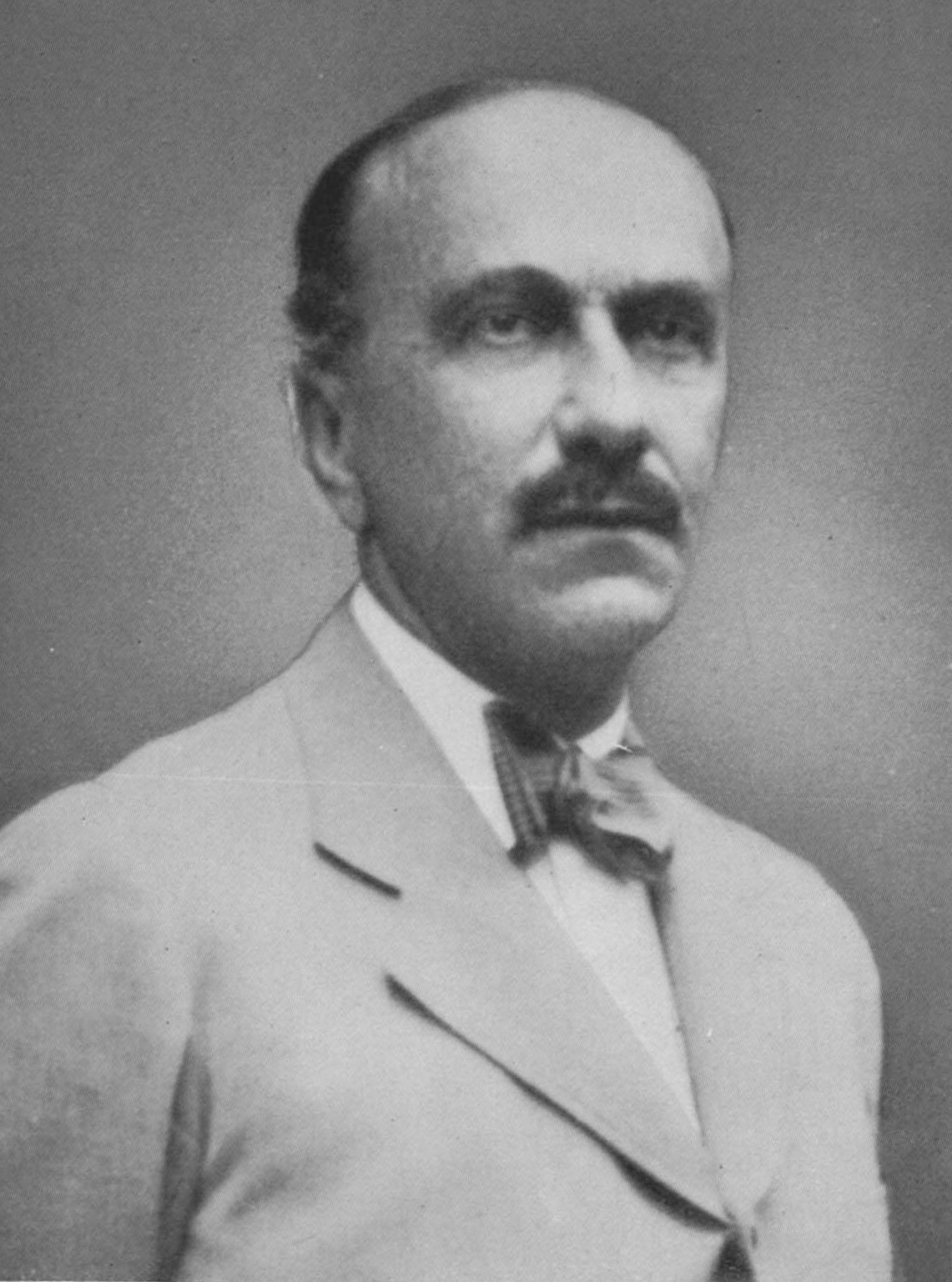

Minister of the Interior of Hungary
- In office 6 June 1922 – 15 October 1926
- Prime Minister: István Bethlen
- Preceded by: Kunó Klebelsberg
- Succeeded by: Béla Scitovszky

Personal details
- Born: 5 February 1885 Budapest, Austria-Hungary
- Died: 9 September 1960 (aged 75) Jászapáti, Hungary
- Party: KNEP, Unity Party
- Profession: politician

Iván Rakovszky de Nagyrákó et Kelemenfalva (5 February 1885 – 9 September 1960) was a Hungarian politician, who served as Interior Minister between 1922 and 1926. He reorganized the police services and reformed their orders. In the cabinet of Géza Lakatos, he was the Minister of Religion and Education (and de facto Deputy Prime Minister).

His wife was Jolán Sándor de Csíkszentmihály, daughter of Kálmán Sándor.

Political offices
Preceded by Kunó Klebelsberg	Minister of the Interior; 1922–1926	Succeeded by Béla Scitovszky
Preceded by István Antal	Minister of Religion and Education; 1944	Succeeded by Ferenc Rajniss
