= Gyula Szekfű =

Hungarian historian and public figure

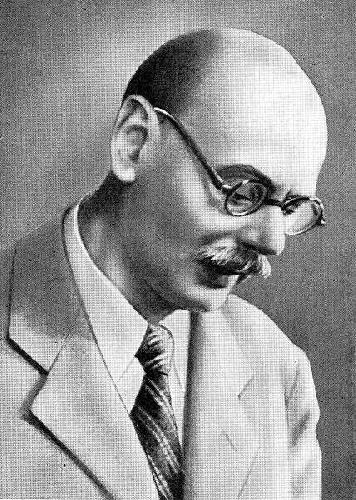
- Gyula Szekfű in 1937
- Born: Gyula Ignac Szekfű; 23 May 1883; Székesfehérvár, Austria-Hungary
- Died: 28 June 1955 (aged 72); Budapest, Hungarian People's Republic
- Resting place: Farkasréti Cemetery
- Occupations: Historian, university professor, diplomat

Gyula Ignac Szekfű (23 May 1883 – 28 June 1955) was a Hungarian historian, university professor, diplomat and public figure.

== Biography ==
Szekfű was born in to a Catholic middle-class family of a lawyer. From 1905 to 1906 he worked at the National Museum of Hungary, and from 1908 to 1910 he was an intern at the National Archives. He spent seventeen years in Vienna, studying documents from the 16th to 18th centuries. From 1925 he was a professor at the Department of Modern Hungarian History at the University of Budapest.

Influenced by Leopold von Ranke, Wilhelm Dilthey, and Friedrich Meinecke, he became the founder of the "spiritual-historical" school in Hungarian historiography, which advocated the idea of a conservative development of his country in the spirit of a "Christian community". In 1920, he published a work entitled "Three Generations" (Hungarian: Három nemzedék. Egy hanyatló kor története), which became one of the most influential works in Hungary during the interwar period. He blamed the division of the country on Hungary's liberal past, which, in his opinion, was alien to its traditions. In his opinion, Hungary would enter an era of nationalist renewal, during which it would be necessary to abandon liberalism, which had “seduced” the Hungarian nobility, in alliance with the Jewish bourgeoisie, to usurp economic and cultural unity and leadership from the Hungarian people. Having an antisemitic viewpoint, he named the anti-national “Jewish spirit” as one of the main reasons for the decline and proposed that Hungary should rid itself not only of communism, but also of “the liberalism that gave birth to it".

From September 1927 to December 1939 he was the editor of the conservative Magyar Szemle, which supported the policies of István Bethlen. Between 1939 and 1944 he was a member of the editorial board of the right-wing newspaper Jelenkor.

During World War II, as a member of the Bethlen group, Szekfű joined the independence and popular front movement. From 1939 to 1944 he was the leading publicist of the conservative magazine Magyar Nemzet, which was critical of the policies of the Nazi Germany from a Christian conservative perspective. He stood up for an independent, free Hungary, writing an article entitled The Concept of Freedom for the Christmas issue of the social-democratic Népszava in 1941, which exemplified the anti-German national unity. He was a participant in the negotiations aimed at establishing the Hungarian Historical Memorial Committee, initially holding the position of chairman, but later stepping down, and did not sign the memorial committee's public appeal either. In September 1942, he testified for the communists in the Schönherz trial. In January 1943, he acted as chief patron at the celebrations organized for the 120th anniversary of Petőfi's birth. In his series of articles entitled " Somewhere We Lost Our Way", published in Magyar Nemzet in 1943–1944, he criticized the official policy of the counter-revolutionary regime and voted for a Western-oriented, moderate conservatism. He retreated during the German occupation, and was forced to go into hiding after the German puppet Arrow Cross took power.

While in hiding, he established contacts with representatives of the Communist, Social Democratic and other anti-fascist parties of Hungary. He remained non-partisan, although he was invited to lead the Christian Democratic People's Party. On 2 April 1945 he was elected to the Provisional National Assembly.

On October 15, 1945, he was appointed Ambassador Extraordinary and Plenipotentiary to Hungary, remaining the ambassador of Hungary to the USSR until September 1948. Preparing the Treaty of Friendship, Cooperation and Mutual Assistance between the USSR and the Hungarian Republic, Szekfű gave multiple lectures praising the leadership of Lenin and Stalin in the Soviet Union. He was a member of parliament from May 1953, and a member of the Presidium of the Hungarian People's Republic in 1954-1955. Szekfü's work "After the Revolution", published in 1947, reflected his desire to critically reconsider his previous views, moving to more progressive democratic positions.

== Selected works ==
- A száműzött Rákóczi (1913)
- Három nemzedék (1920)
- Három nemzedék és ami utána következik (1934)
- Valahol utat vesztettünk (1943)
- Nép, nemzet, állam. Válogatott tanulmányok (2002)
