= József Vass =

Hungarian politician (1877–1930)

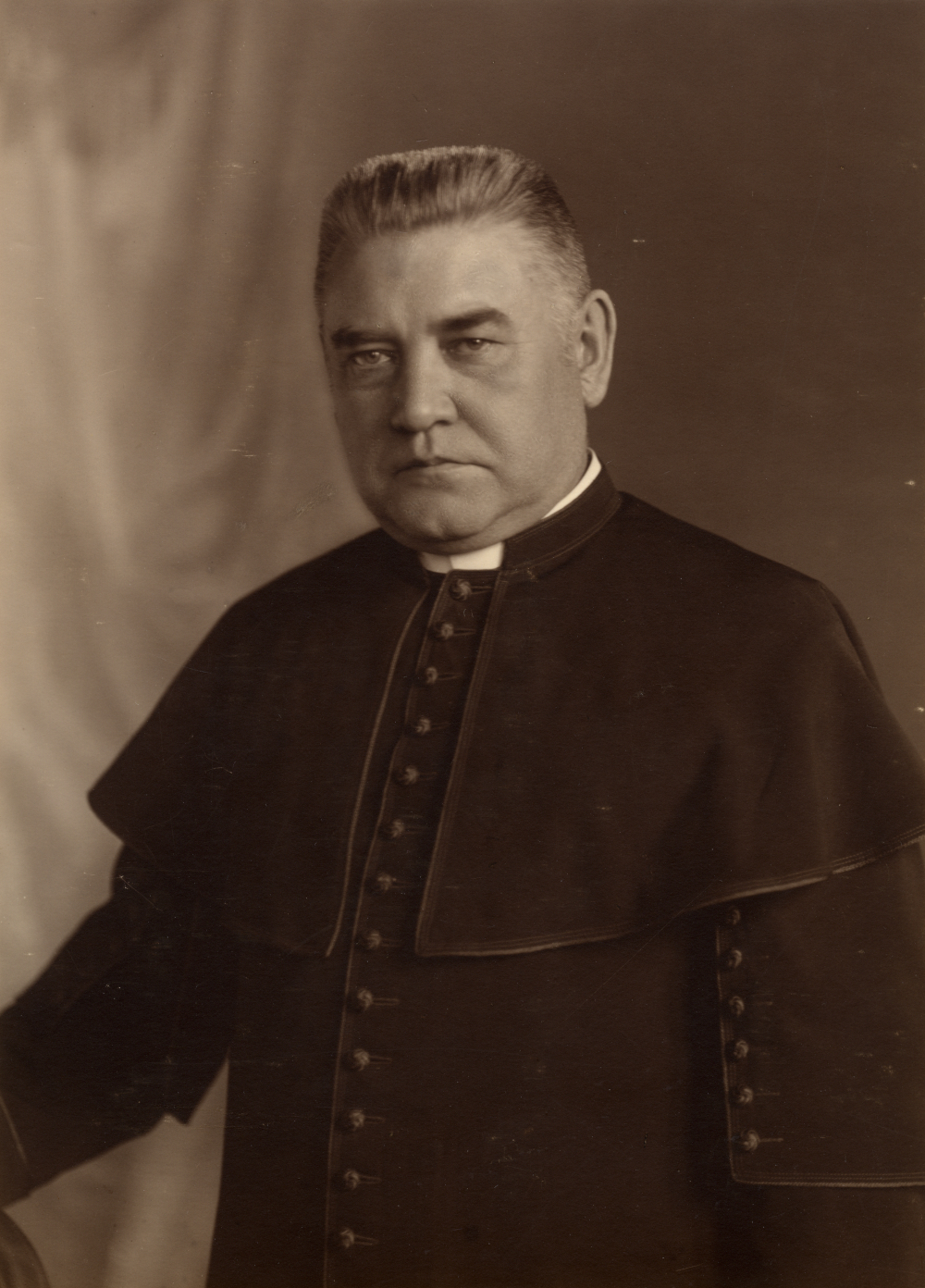

Minister of Religion and Education of Hungary
- In office 16 December 1920 – 16 June 1922
- Prime Minister: Pál Teleki; István Bethlen
- Preceded by: István Haller
- Succeeded by: Kunó Klebelsberg

Personal details
- Born: 25 April 1877 Sárvár, Austria-Hungary
- Died: 8 September 1930 (aged 53) Budapest, Hungary
- Party: KGSZP, KNEP, Unity Party
- Profession: politician, provost

József Vass (25 April 1877 – 8 September 1930) was a Hungarian priest and politician, who served as Minister of Religion and Education between 1920 and 1922. He finished his theological studies in Rome. After his ordination he became chaplain in Adony. He was transferred to Székesfehérvár, where he devised a religious daily. Vass became director of the Saint Emeric Dormitory in 1911. He worked as a teacher for the University of Pest's Faculty of Theology from 1917. he became a member of the Diet of Hungary in 1920.

Pál Teleki appointed him Minister of Food on 15 August 1920. After that he served as Minister of Religion and Education. During the king's attempts to retake the throne of Hungary he tried to mediate between Charles IV and Regent Miklós Horthy, because he had good legitimist relations. From 1922 until his death he served as Minister of Welfare and Labour. His notion anti-worker pervaded his social policy activity. He revealed huge material abuses in his ministry. At the time of his death he was labour minister.

He organized the rescue and restoring works on the time of the flood of Budapest in 1923. He became provost of Kalocsa in 1924. He was awarded honorary citizenship of Esztergom in 1926 and of Újpest in 1928.

Political offices
Preceded by István Haller	Minister of Religion and Education; 1920–1922	Succeeded by Kunó Klebelsberg
