= Dénesfa =

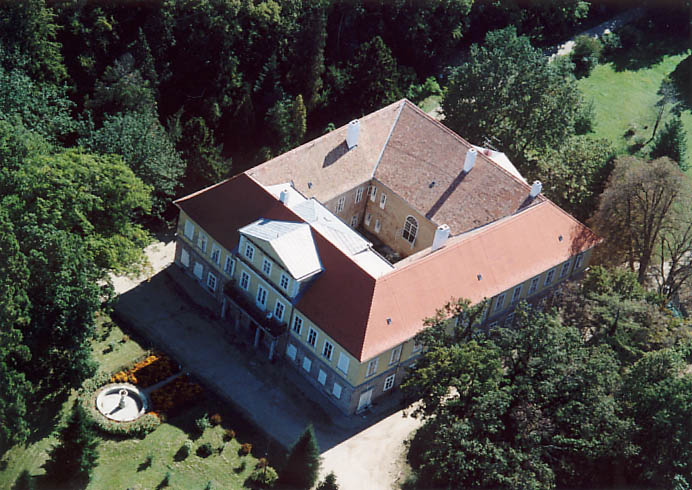
- Aerial photograph of the castle in Dénesfa

- Coat of arms

- Location of Győr-Moson-Sopron county in Hungary

- Location of Dénesfa
- Coordinates: 47.45786°N 17.03397°E
- Country: Hungary
- County: Győr-Moson-Sopron

Area
  - Total: 17.54 km^{2} (6.77 sq mi)

Population (2004)
  - Total: 375
  - Density: 21.37/km^{2} (55.3/sq mi)
- Time zone: UTC+1 (CET)
  - Summer (DST): UTC+2 (CEST)
- Postal code: 9365
- Area code: 96

Dénesfa is a village in Győr-Moson-Sopron county, Hungary.
