= Ödön Beniczky =

Hungarian politician (1878–1931)

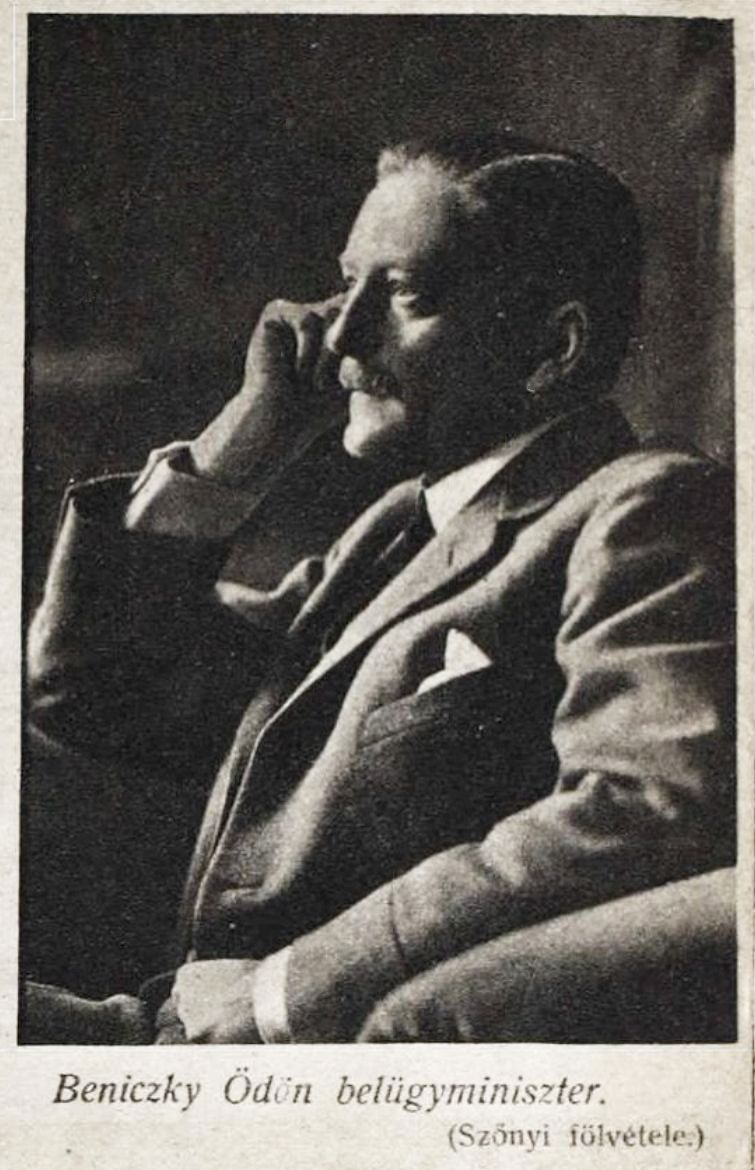

Minister of the Interior of Hungary
- In office 11 September 1919 – 15 March 1920
- Preceded by: István Friedrich
- Succeeded by: Sándor Simonyi-Semadam

Personal details
- Born: 12 February 1878 Zólyom, Austria-Hungary
- Died: 20 January 1931 (aged 52) Budapest, Hungary
- Party: KNEP
- Profession: journalist, politician

Ödön Beniczky de Benice et Micsinye (12 February 1878 – 20 January 1931) was a Hungarian legitimist politician, who served as Interior Minister between 1919 and 1920. He was a resolute adversary of Governor Miklós Horthy. He supported the king Charles IV in the king's attempts to retake the throne of Hungary. That is why Beniczky was arrested for a short time. He published his statement before the military public prosecutor's department in his newspaper ("Az Újság") about the White Terror. He was sentenced to two years in prison for insulting Horthy. Beniczky's case was a huge scandal in Hungary, but the legitimists didn't use these happenings against the governor.

Following his release, Beniczky failed as representative candidate. He committed suicide in 1931.

Political offices
Preceded by István Friedrich	Minister of the Interior; 1919–1920	Succeeded by Sándor Simonyi-Semadam
