= Antal Lehár =

Austro-Hungarian officer (1876–1962)

Anton Freiherr von Lehár
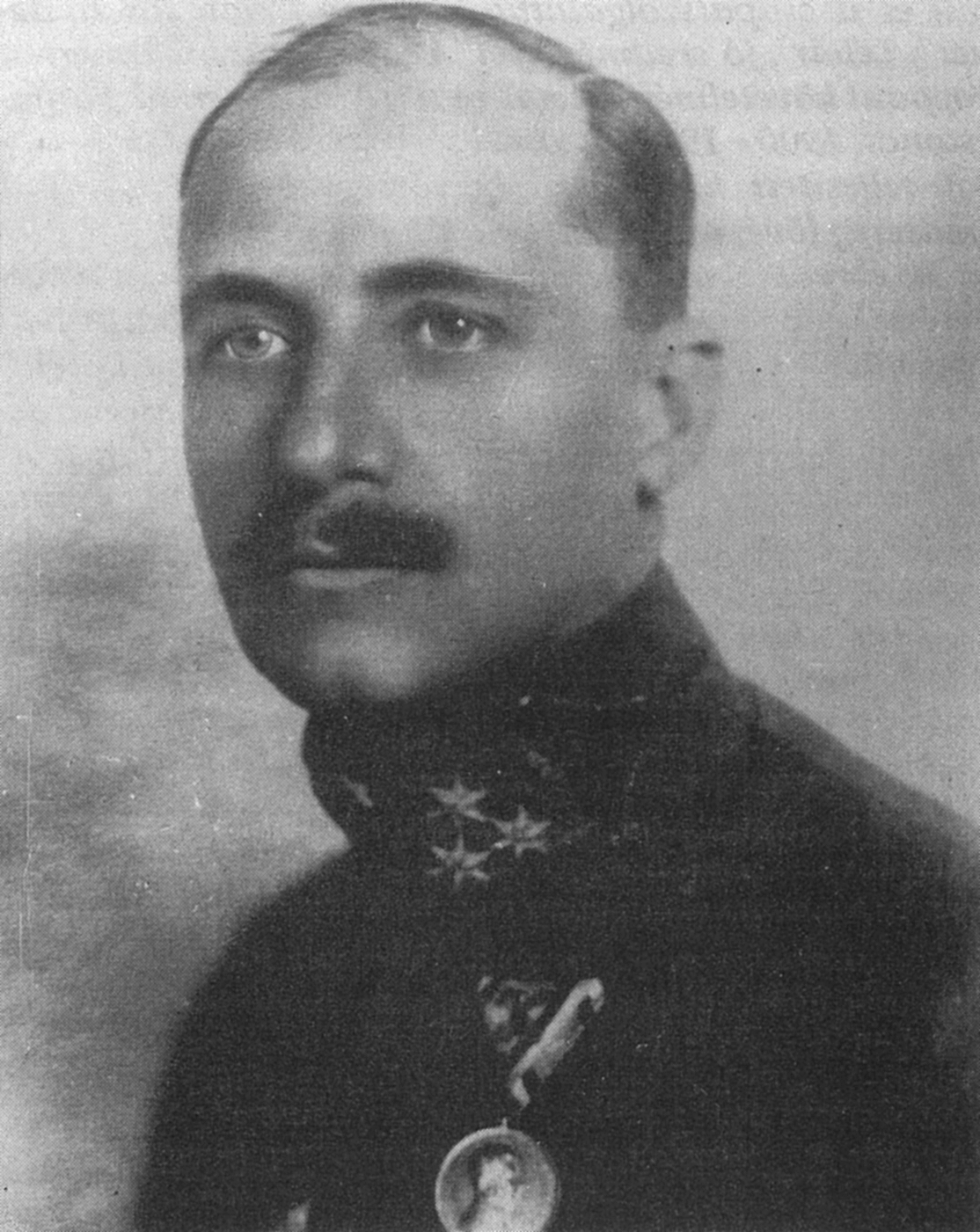
- Born: 21 February 1876; Ödenburg, Austria-Hungary
- Died: 12 November 1962 (aged 86); Vienna, Austria
- Burial place: Buried at Klosterneuburg
- Military career
- Allegiance: Austria-Hungary; Kingdom of Hungary
- Service years: 1893–1921
- Rank: Generalmajor
- Awards: Military Merit Medal (Austria-Hungary); Officers' cross of the Order of the Star of Romania; 4th class of the Ottoman Osmanie Order; Orden der Eisernen Krone 3.Klasse mit Kriegsdekoration; Iron Cross 2nd Class; Militärverdienstkreuz III.Klasse mit Kriegsdekoration und Schwertern; Goldene Tapferkeitsmedaille; Knight's Cross of the Military Order of Maria Theresa

Antal Freiherr von Lehár (born Antal Lehár; 21 February 1876 – 12 November 1962; known sometimes as Baron Antal Lehár) was an Austrian officer of Hungarian descent, who reached the pinnacle of his service after World War I when he supported the former Emperor Charles I of Austria's attempts to retake the throne of Hungary. His brother was composer Ferenc Lehár.

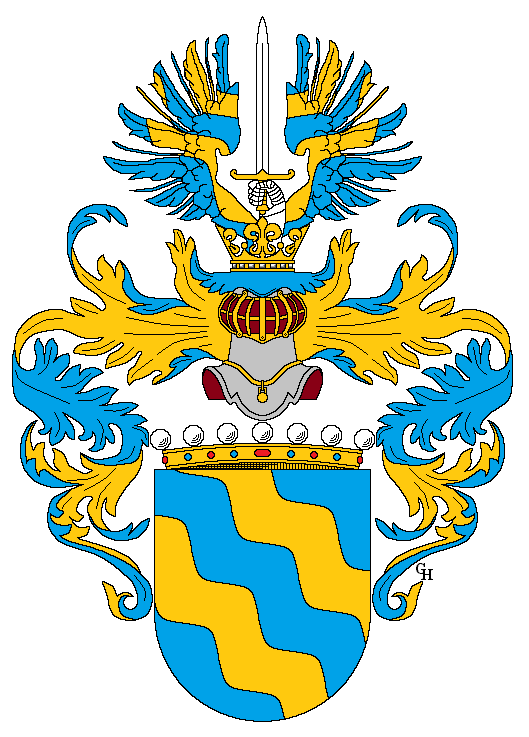
Lehár's arms as a baron, 1918.

== Early life ==
Lehár was born in Ödenburg (now Sopron), Austria-Hungary, as the younger son of a bandmaster in the Infantry Regiment No. 50 of the Austro-Hungarian Army. He attended schools in Preßburg (Pozsony, today Bratislava), Prague and Vienna. He entered cadet school in Vienna to become a professional officer, finishing in 1893 top of his class. Following a posting to his father's regiment, he was promoted Leutnant in 1894 and Oberleutnant in 1898. Between 1897 and 1899 Lehár attended the Kriegsschule (war college) in Vienna, after which he was attached to the general staff and served in a number of training positions until World War I.

== World War I ==
Following the outbreak of World War I, Lehár, now with the rank of Major, was put in command of the 2nd battalion of the Honvéd-Landsturm Infantry Regiment No. 13, which he led in September 1914 during battles at Chodel south of Lublin. His battalion was part of the Army group "Kummer" and served next to the unit of General Viktor Dankl. For his conduct there, Lehár would later be decorated with the Knight's Cross of the Military Order of Maria Theresa (see below). While still fighting near Lublin, Lehár was severely wounded.

After leaving hospital he was reassigned to the War ministry in Vienna and in September 1915 he served in the Tyrolean Defence Command. Following promotion to Oberstleutnant in September 1915, Lehár returned to fighting, this time on the Italian front. There he commanded the Heeresgruppe "Lehar" in the Etschtal-Rovereto sector of the Italian front, which consisted of Tyrolese Standschützen and Bosniaks. In June 1916 he was transferred back to the technical Military committee and became head of the department for infantry and cavalry weapons. Assignments to the Eastern front and to the office of Hermann Kövess von Kövessháza followed. Later he was transferred to the newly raised Infantry Regiment 106 and commanded this unit in the battles on the Piave. He served in the Infantry Regiment 106 until the end of the war. In May 1918 he was promoted to Oberst and received the Golden Bravery Medal for Officers.

In August 1918 Lehár was decorated with the Knight's Cross of the Military Order of Maria Theresa in recognition of his services during the battles at Chodel south of Lublin in September 1914. In accordance with the statutes of this order, Lehár became a baron in his country's nobility and was thereafter styled "Freiherr von Lehár", while his brother Franz remained a commoner.

At the conclusion of hostilities of World War I, Lehár was able to move his regiment, without any casualties or desertion, back to Steinamanger (now Szombathely, Hungary).

== Hungary ==
After the dissolution of the Austro-Hungarian Empire, Oberst Anton Freiherr von Lehár decided to remain in Hungary and to fight again for the monarchy, in several roles and at various theatres of war. He played an important role in the counterrevolution in Hungary. In August 1919 he became the military commander of Western Hungary and was promoted to Major General by Regent Miklós Horthy.

When the former King Charles IV tried to return to the Hungarian throne, Lehár joined his troops, but the mission failed. While the former monarch was transported into exile, Lehár escaped from Hungary and fled through Czechoslovakia to Germany where he hid with friends of his brother.

== Life as a businessman ==
When the political turmoil had calmed down, Anton's brother Franz Lehár organized for the former general a job as director of the Society of Authors, Composers and Music Publishers in Berlin in 1926. With the rise of the National Socialist Party, Freiherr von Lehár was, as a dedicated Austrian-Hungarian monarchist, soon considered suspect. When the National Socialists assumed power in 1933 (Machtergreifung), he had to leave Berlin.

Back in Vienna, Lehár founded the Chodel Music Publishing Company, but after it did not prosper, he decided to hand over the business to his brother in 1935. He then moved to the countryside, becoming a farmer in Theresienfeld near Wiener Neustadt in Lower Austria. When Germany occupied Austria in March 1938 (Anschluss), Lehár was ordered to move to Vienna, where the Gestapo could keep a closer eye on him and his wife for much of World War II. After Franz Lehár's death in October 1948, the former general became the administrator of his estate and spent the rest of his life guarding the rights and promoting the popularity of his brother's music.

Anton Freiherr von Lehár died in Vienna in 1962, aged 86.
