= Teuchert =

Teuchert is a German language habitational surname. Notable people with it include:

- Bert Teuchert (1966), boxer
- Cedric Teuchert (1997), professional footballer
- Hermann Teuchert (1880−1972), historical linguist
- Wolfgang Teuchert (1924−2010), art historian
