= Włostów =

Włostów may refer to the following places:

- Włostów, Gorzów County in Lubusz Voivodeship (west Poland)
- Włostów, Żary County in Lubusz Voivodeship (west Poland)
- Włostów, Świętokrzyskie Voivodeship (south-central Poland)
