= Olszyniec =

Olszyniec may refer to the following places in Poland:

- Olszyniec, Lower Silesian Voivodeship (south-west Poland)
- Olszyniec, Lubusz Voivodeship (west Poland)
