= Giessen (disambiguation) =

Giessen is a town in Hesse, Germany.

Giessen may also refer to:

- Giessen (district), district of Hesse, Germany
- Giessen (region), region of Hesse, Germany
- Giessen, Netherlands, a village in the municipality of Altena
- The former German name of what is today the town of Jeże, Lubusz_Voivodeship, Poland

== See also ==
- Giesen, a village in Lower Saxony, Germany
