= Kawałek Kulki =

Polish Alternative Rock Band

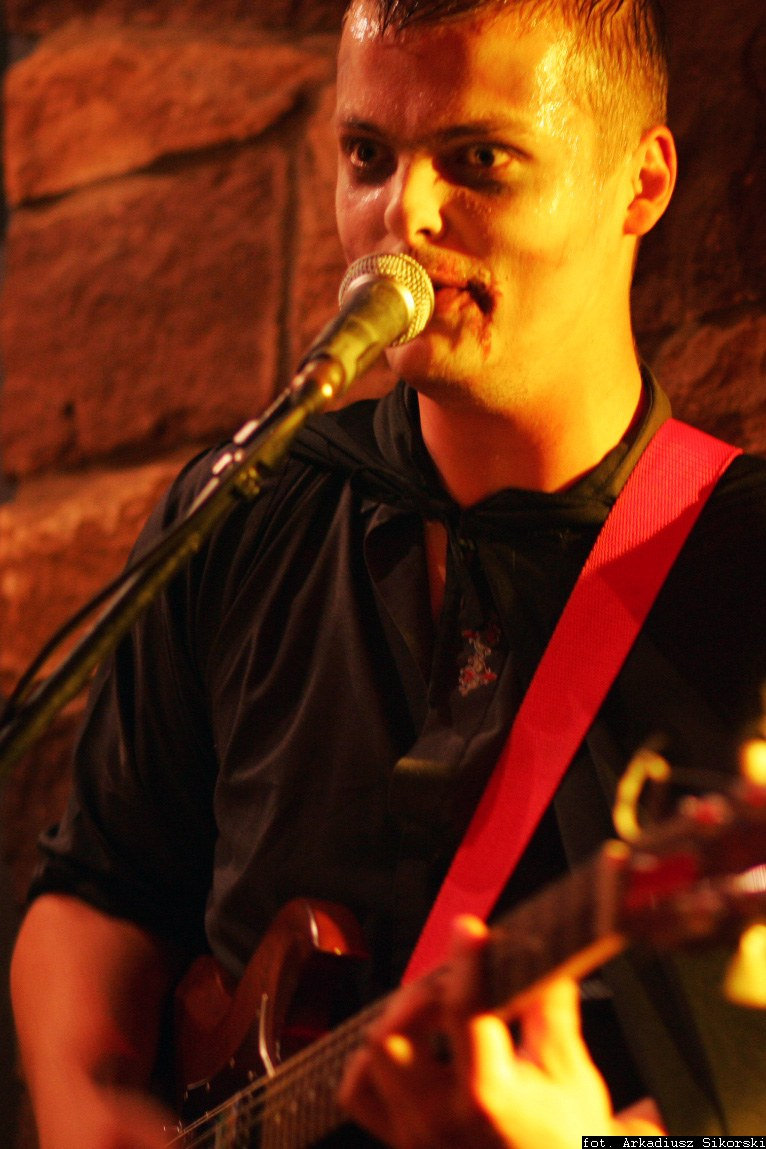
- Błażej Król during a concert in Gorzów Wielkopolski, 2008.

Background information
- Origin: Gorzów Wielkopolski, Poland
- Genres: Alternative rock
- Label: Luna Music
- Members: Magdalena Turłaj; Błażej Król; Maciej Parada; Jacek Szmytkowski
- Past members: Paweł Turłaj; Bartosz “Niedźwiedź” Matuszewski; Karol Wiśniewski; Jacek Dębicki; Piotr Kozaryn

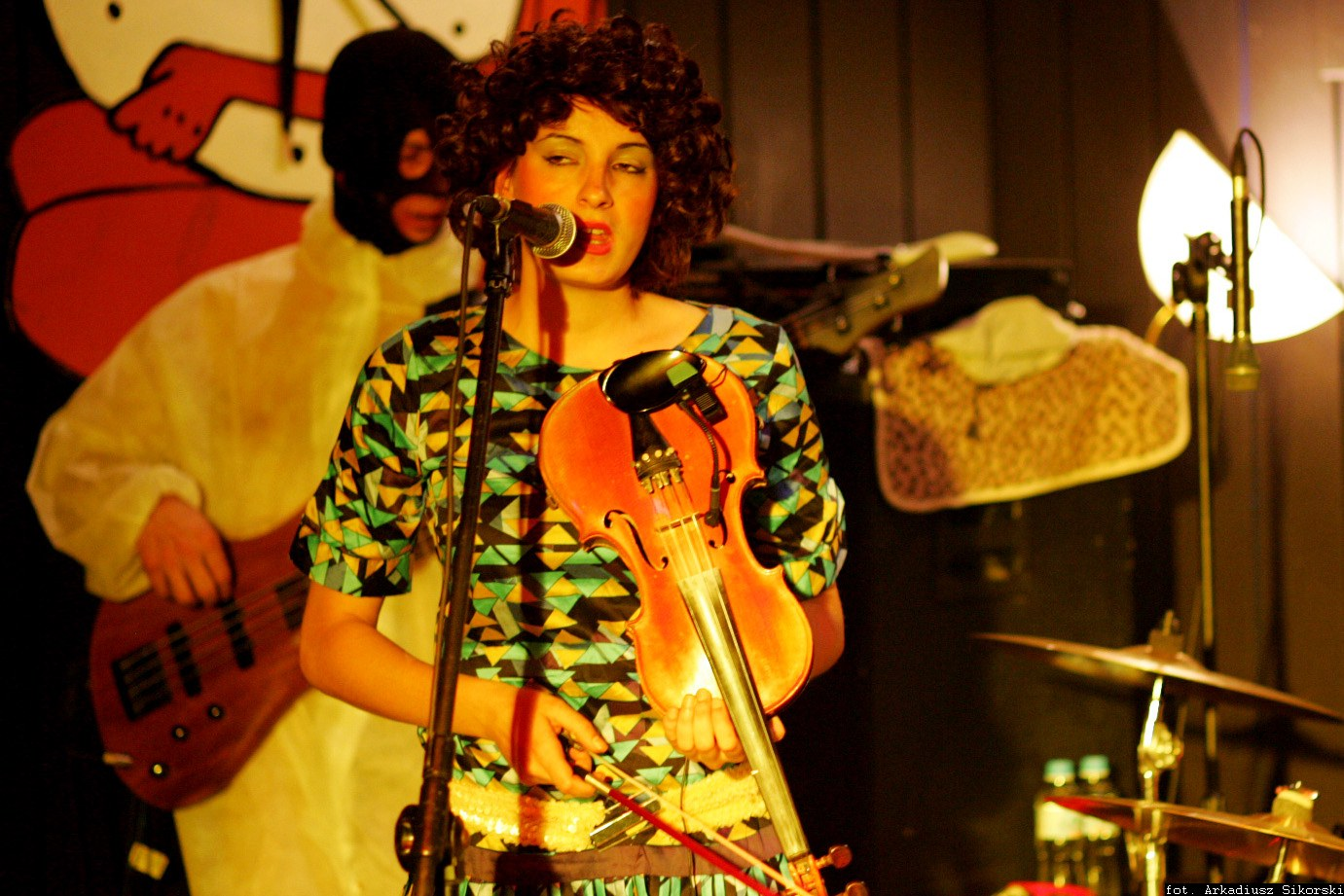
Magdalena “Karotka” Turłaj during a concert in Gorzów Wielkopolski in 2008.

Kawałek Kulki (abbreviated as KAQ) is a Polish band formed in 2001 in Gorzów Wielkopolski. Their music is described as a combination of rock and sung poetry and classified as alternative rock. Their first studio album, preceded by three EPs, was released in November 2007. The second album, entitled Noc poza domem/error, was released in April 2010.

== History ==
The members themselves do not know what the name of the band originated from. Błażej Król says: “To be honest, I myself have no idea where the name Kawałek Kulki comes from. It was born spontaneously, as a result of brainstorming. Everyone can now make up their own story.”

=== 2001-2005: The beginning ===
The band was formed in 2001 in Wieprzyce, one of the districts of Gorzów Wielkopolski, where Paweł Turłaj, Magdalena’s brother, played along with the guitarist Błażej Król. In 2002 and 2003 the band won the music contest organized by City Cultural Centre in Gorzów Wielkopolski. It was also in 2003 that their first EP, Wybucha Bomba, was released.

In 2004 Kawałek Kulki won both audience and best lyrics prize at Rock Festival in Gorzów Wielkopolski. Soon after, they made their debut on Radio Zachód with a song Kolegi tata jest policjantem, featured on the second EP Wyprawa w poszukiwaniu raf koralowych rzeki Warty z Kawałkiem Kulki w kieszeni, released in autumn 2004. In 2005 another EP, entitled Radio Wieprzyce, was released.

=== 2007–present: Kawałek Kulki ===
In January 2007 the band performed in their hometown during a local finale of Wielka Orkiestra Świątecznej Pomocy (The Great Orchestra of Christmas Charity). In March Błażej Król received a music scholarship from the mayor of Gorzów Wielkopolski. Their debut longplay album Kawałek kulki was released on November 9, 2007 by Luna Music . The album, which consisted of 14 songs, received a generally favourable critical reaction.

The music served by Kawałek Kulki on their debut album is exactly the same as the name of the band: surrealistic, gently absurd, evoking the magical atmosphere of children’s frolics and at the same time intriguing and inventive. […] Kawałek Kulki on one occasion sounds folk and on another rock or jazz but above all it sounds natural. Thanks to them for that.

— Marek Świrkowicz, Teraz Rock magazine.

A piece of positive, sometimes nicely twisted music. A lot of good songs on one album and potential hits but rather not necessarily radio hits. It’s really worth listening to.

— Marcin Komsta, relaz.pl

At the same time the band was accused of monotony.

The longer you listen to Kawałek Kulki the more monotonous the subsequent melodies become. It all sounds rather similar, repetitive and taking into consideration the fact that the band has an enormous potential, an effect opposite to what was intended is created. Some kind of “overcomplication” sneaks in, maybe an excess of means of expression.

— Ewa Kuba, gery.pl.

On the 5th of November the band performed in S-1 concert studio of Szczecin Polish Radio, presenting the material from their new album. In August 2008 Kawałek Kulki played on the forest stage during the 1st day of OFF Festival held in Mysłowice.

In July 2009 a song Bajka, created on the basis of Tadeusz Gajcy’s poem, was included in the album Gajcy which was released to honour the 65th anniversary of the poet’s death. Apart from Kawałek Kulki, on the album appeared other artists, including Kazik Staszewski, Pogodno, Maleo Reggae Rockers, Pustki, Dezerter and Lech Janerka. Moreover, most of the musicians performed on the 25th of July in Wolności Park in the Warsaw Uprising Museum during a concert promoting the material from this album.

=== Members ===
==== Current members ====
- Magdalena Turłaj – violin, vocal
- Błażej Król – electric guitar, vocal
- Maciej Parada – bass guitar
- Jacek Szmytkowski – drums

==== Former members ====
- Paweł Turłaj – drums
- Bartosz “Niedźwiedź” Matuszewski – drums
- Karol Wiśniewski – drums
- Jacek Dębicki – drums
- Piotr Kozaryn – bass gitar

=== Discography ===
- Wybucha Bomba (EP, 2003)
- Wyprawa w poszukiwaniu raf koralowych rzeki Warty z Kawałkiem Kulki w kieszeni (EP, 2004)
- Radio Wieprzyce (EP, 2005)
- Kawałek Kulki (2007)
- Noc poza domem/error (2010)

=== Other albums featuring Kawałek Kulki ===
- Nadzieja Lubuskiej Sceny 2004 (Radio Zachód, 2004)
- Trzymaj z Nami cz.2 (Polskie Radio S.A., 2006)
- Radio Lampa 4 (Lampa, 2006)
- Gajcy (Muzeum Powstania Warszawskiego, 2009)
