= Richard Sedlmaier =

German art historian

Richard Sedlmaier (10 August 1890 – 1 June 1963) was a German art historian.

== living and working ==
Born in Würzburg, Sedlmaier was the son of the merchant Adalbert Sedlmaier and his wife Auguste née Hagen. He grew up in Würzburg and passed his Abitur in 1909. From 1909 to 1916 he studied art history, archaeology and literary history at the universities of Munich, Wien, Berlin and Würzburg . In 1916 he was awarded the title of Dr. phil. in Würzburg with the work Grundlagen der Rokoko-Ornamentik in Frankreich doctorates. From 1917 he was curator at the Museum of Art History of the University of Würzburg. In 1923 habilitated he began a thesis on the Würzburg Residence and became private lecturer at the Art History Institute of the University of Würzburg.

In 1927 he was appointed professor with chair at the University of Rostock, where he headed the Institute of Art History until 1939 and was Dean in 1933/1934. His research focus shifted to the study of architecture and fine arts in northern Germany. Wolfgang Müller was one of his students.

In 1939 Sedlmaier took over the chair of art history at the Christian-Albrechts-Universität zu Kiel from Arthur Haseloff and became director of the Kunsthalle Kiel. His teaching activities focused on the art of the international Baroque and ornamental art as well as architecture, painting and sculpture of the German Middle Ages.

During the Second World War, Sedlmaier tried to maintain the teaching activities. In 1942, he organized a study trip to Prague, Vienna, Salzburg, Munich and Augsburg on the subject of "German Baroque and Rococo Art". As director of the Kunsthalle, he tried to avoid confrontation with the Reichskulturkammer and to make exhibitions possible by means of suitable themes. Under the motto "Zur Kunst der deutschen Stämme" [On the Art of German Tribes], he organized the exhibitions "Schlesische Künstler" [Silesian Artists] (1940), "Gäste aus der Reichshauptstadt" [Guests from the Reich Capital] (1942) and "Fränkische Künstler" [Franconian Artists] (1944), which were supported by public funds. After the destruction of the Kunsthalle by air raids on Kiel the exhibition activities had to be stopped in 1944.

After the Second World War, the Kunsthistorisches Institut was briefly relocated to Schleswig in 1945, where Sedlmaier was represented by Lilli Martius during the summer semester. In the winter semester 1945/1946 the institute was moved back to Kiel. Sedlmaier, Lilli Martius and Arthur Haseloff held lectures and Sedlmaier made special efforts to rebuild the Kunsthalle and restore the collection. This made it possible to integrate works by Emil Nolde, Ernst Ludwig Kirchner and Ernst Barlach, among others, into the collection. From 1948 Sedlmaier concentrated on the planning and execution of the necessary building measures; from 1950 onwards, larger exhibitions could be shown again. In 1958 the Kunsthalle was reopened with the expanded collection. In the same year he was awarded the Federal Cross of Merit for his "services to art and art studies".

In teaching and research, Sedlmaier was primarily concerned with questions of regional medieval art. Among his students were Wolfgang J. Müller, who came to Kiel from Rostock in 1946 and habilitated under Sedlmaier in 1950, as well as Gerhard Wietek, Wolfgang Teuchert and Alfred Kamphausen. Sedlmaier became emeritus in 1958 and died in 1963 in Tegernsee at the age of 72.

== Awards ==
- 1958: Order of Merit of the Federal Republic of Germany

== Publications ==
- Grundlagen der Rokoko-Ornamentik in Frankreich. Dissertation. University of Würzburg 1917. Heitz & Mundel, Strassburg 18917.
- Schönherr und das österreichische Volksstück. Verlagsdruckerei Würzburg, Würzburg 1920.
- with Rudolf Pfister: Die fürstbischöfliche Residenz zu Würzburg. 2 volumes. Georg Müller, Munich 1928.
- Rostock (series Deutsche Lande Deutsche Kunst). Deutscher Kunstverlag, Berlin 1931. 2nd edition 1943.
- Deutsche Malerei des 20. Jahrhunderts. Kunsthalle, Kiel 1951.
- Emil Nolde. Schleswig-Holsteinischer Kunstverein, Kiel 1952.
- Johann Wolfgang van der Auwera Schönborn-Grabmäler im Mainfränkischen Museum und die Grabmalkunst der Schönborn-Bischöfe. With a foreword by Max H. von Freeden. Freunde Mainfränkischer Kunst und Geschichte, Würzburg 1955.
- with Olaf Klose: Alt-Kiel und die Kieler Landschaft. Westholsteinische Verlags-Anstalt, Heide in Holstein 1956.

Sedlmaier was editor of the magazines Kunst in Franken and Mecklenburgische Bilderhefte.

== Literature ==
- Fritz Fuglsang (ed.): Richard Sedlmaier als Festschrift zum 70. Geburtstag am 10. August 1960 gewidmet (Nordelbingen. 28/29). Boyens, Heide in Holstein 1960, ISSN 0078-1037.
- Maren Hasenpath: Richard Sedlmaier (1890–1963). Kriegsjahre und Wiederaufbauphase. In Hans-Dieter Nägelke (ed.): Kunstgeschichte in Kiel. 100 Jahre Kunsthistorisches Institut der Christian-Albrechts-Universität, 1893–1993. Kunsthistorischen Institut der Christian-Albrechts-Universität zu, Kiel 1994, ISBN 3-928794-11-6, pp. 56–62.
