= Miłowice =

Miłowice may refer to the following places in Poland:

- Miłowice, Lower Silesian Voivodeship (south-west Poland)
- Miłowice, Lubusz Voivodeship (west Poland)
- Miłowice, Opole Voivodeship (south-west Poland)
