= Roszkowice, Lubusz Voivodeship =

Roszkowice
- Village
- Location within Poland
- Coordinates: 52°37′N 15°6′E
- Country: Poland
- Voivodeship: Lubusz
- County: Gorzów
- Gmina: Bogdaniec
- Population: 30

Roszkowice [rɔʂkɔˈvit͡sɛ] is a village in the administrative district of Gmina Bogdaniec, within Gorzów County, Lubusz Voivodeship, in western Poland.
