= Grabik, Lubusz Voivodeship =

Grabik
- Village
- Location within Poland
- Coordinates: 51°39′N 15°6′E
- Country: Poland
- Voivodeship: Lubusz
- County: Żary
- Gmina: Żary

Grabik [ˈɡrabik] (Lower Sorbian: Hrabje; Lower Sorbian: Liceńske grabje) is a village in the administrative district of Gmina Żary, within Żary County, Lubusz Voivodeship, in western Poland.

In village play local football team Sparta Grabik which is currently playing at Klasa A level. The highest level at which team had played was IV liga in 2009–12 years.
