= Racław, Lubusz Voivodeship =

Racław
- Village
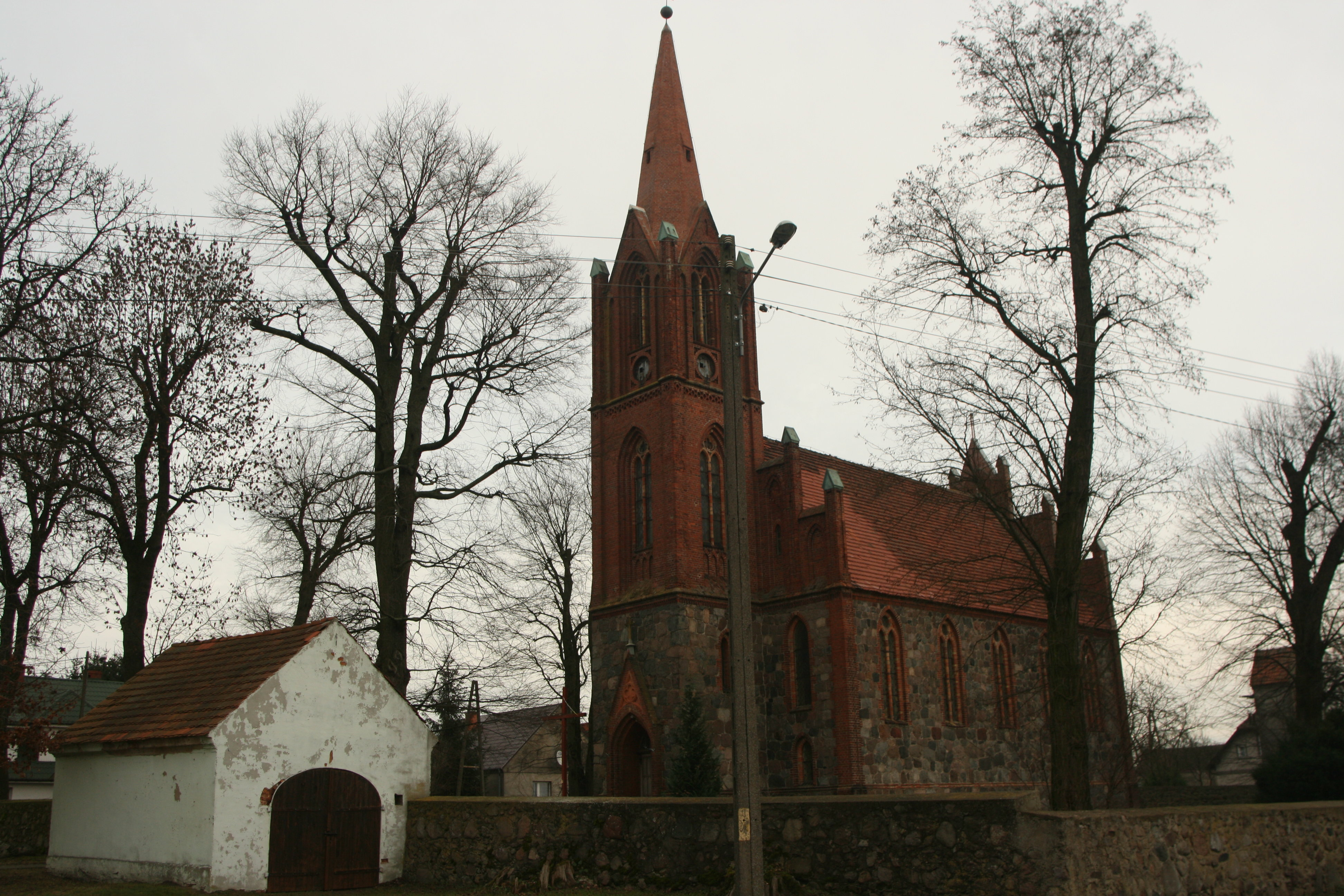
- Catholic church

- Location within Poland
- Coordinates: 52°43′47″N 15°5′25″E
- Country: Poland
- Voivodeship: Lubusz
- County: Gorzów
- Gmina: Bogdaniec
- Population: 310

Racław [ˈrat͡swaf] is a village in the administrative district of Gmina Bogdaniec, within Gorzów County, Lubusz Voivodeship, in western Poland.
