= Bieniów, Lubusz Voivodeship =

Bieniów
- Village
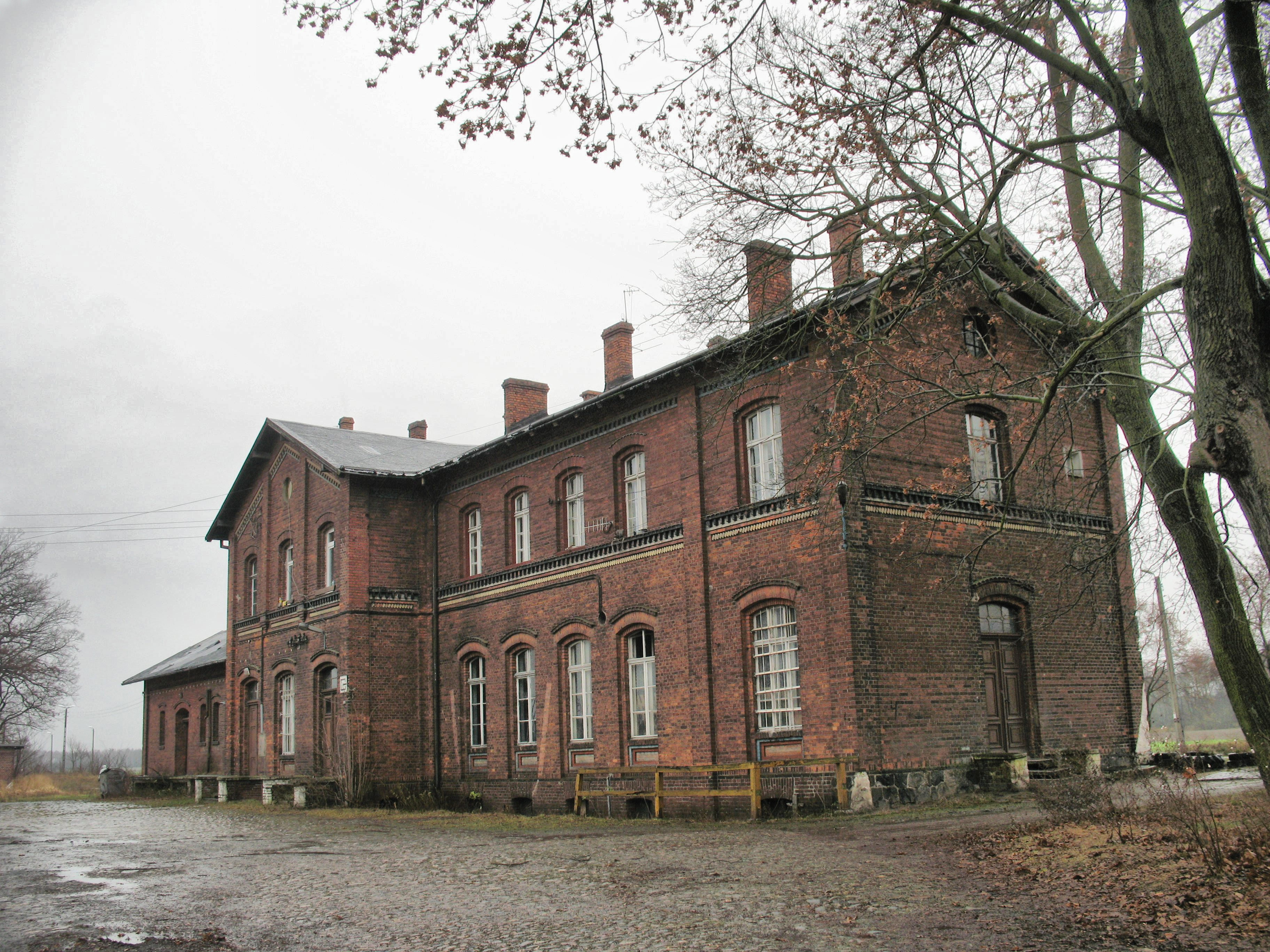
- Railway station

- Location within Poland
- Coordinates: 51°43′6″N 15°10′38″E
- Country: Poland
- Voivodeship: Lubusz
- County: Żary
- Gmina: Żary
- Website: http://bieniow.w.interia.pl/

Bieniów [ˈbjɛɲuf] is a village in the administrative district of Gmina Żary, within Żary County, Lubusz Voivodeship, in western Poland.
