= Janików, Lubusz Voivodeship =

Janików
- Village
- Location within Poland
- Coordinates: 51°34′22″N 14°58′50″E
- Country: Poland
- Voivodeship: Lubusz
- County: Żary
- Gmina: Żary

Janików [jaˈnikuf] (Lower Sorbian: Janikow) is a village in the administrative district of Gmina Żary, within Żary County, Lubusz Voivodeship, in western Poland.
