= Kwiatkowice, Lubusz Voivodeship =

Kwiatkowice
- Village
- Location within Poland
- Coordinates: 52°40′N 15°5′E
- Country: Poland
- Voivodeship: Lubusz
- County: Gorzów
- Gmina: Bogdaniec
- Population: 200

Kwiatkowice [kfjatkɔˈvit͡sɛ] is a village in the administrative district of Gmina Bogdaniec, within Gorzów County, Lubusz Voivodeship, in western Poland.
