= Surowa, Lubusz Voivodeship =

Surowa
- Village
- Location within Poland
- Coordinates: 51°41′N 15°8′E
- Country: Poland
- Voivodeship: Lubusz
- County: Żary
- Gmina: Żary

Surowa [suˈrɔva] (Lower Sorbian: Syry; Upper Sorbian: Roh) is a village in the administrative district of Gmina Żary, within Żary County, Lubusz Voivodeship, in western Poland.
