= Gmina Bogdaniec =

Gmina Bogdaniec Bogdaniec Commune
- Gmina
- Flag Coat of arms

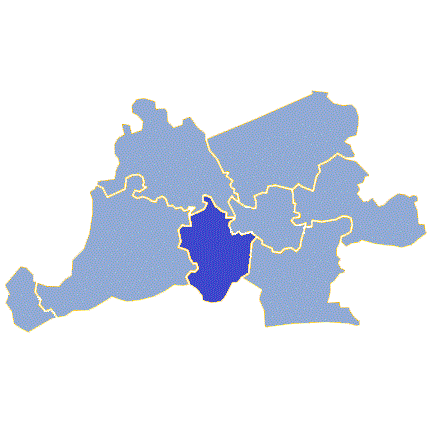
- Location in Gorzów County
- Coordinates (Bogdaniec): 52°41′N 15°4′E
- Country: Poland
- Voivodeship: Lubusz
- County: Gorzów
- Seat: Bogdaniec

Area
  - Total: 112.12 km^{2} (43.29 sq mi)

Population (2019-06-30)
  - Total: 7,117
  - Density: 63.48/km^{2} (164.4/sq mi)
- Website: https://www.bogdaniec.pl

Gmina Bogdaniec is a rural gmina (administrative district) in Gorzów County, Lubusz Voivodeship, in western Poland. Its seat is the village of Bogdaniec, which lies approximately 14 kilometres (9 mi) south-west of Gorzów Wielkopolski.

The gmina covers an area of 112.12 square kilometres (43.3 sq mi), and as of 2019 its total population was 7,117.

== Villages ==
Gmina Bogdaniec contains the villages and settlements of Bogdaniec, Chwałowice, Gostkowice, Jasiniec, Jenin, Jeninek, Jeniniec, Jeże, Jeżyki, Krzyszczyna, Krzyszczynka, Kwiatkowice, Lubczyno, Łupowo, Motylewo, Podjenin, Racław, Roszkowice, Stanowice, Wieprzyce Dolne and Włostów.

== Neighbouring gminas ==
Gmina Bogdaniec is bordered by the city of Gorzów Wielkopolski and by the gminas of Deszczno, Krzeszyce, Lubiszyn and Witnica.

== Twin towns – sister cities ==
Gmina Bogdaniec is twinned with:

- Petershagen-Eggersdorf, Germany
