= Złotnik =

- Village
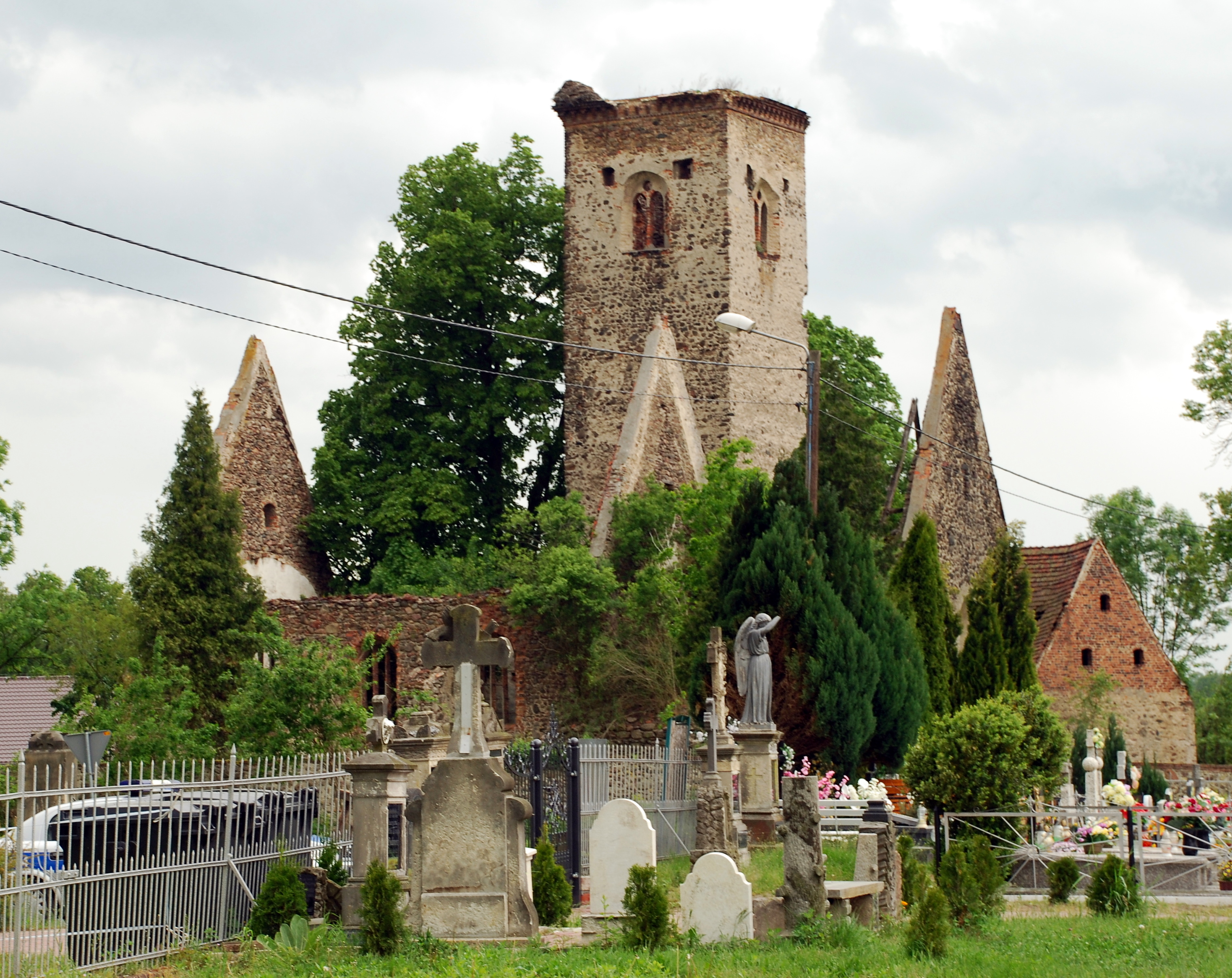
- Ruins of the Church of Saint John the Baptist

- Location within Poland
- Coordinates: 51°41′13″N 15°11′31″E
- Country: Poland
- Voivodeship: Lubusz
- County: Żary
- Gmina: Żary

Population
  - Total: 870
- Vehicle registration: FZA

Złotnik [ˈzwɔtnik] (Upper Sorbian: Goldschmied) is a village in the administrative district of Gmina Żary, within Żary County, Lubusz Voivodeship, in western Poland.

After World War II, Poles repatriated from Pleșa, Solonețu Nou and Panka settled in Złotnik.
