= Stanowice, Lubusz Voivodeship =

Stanowice
- Village
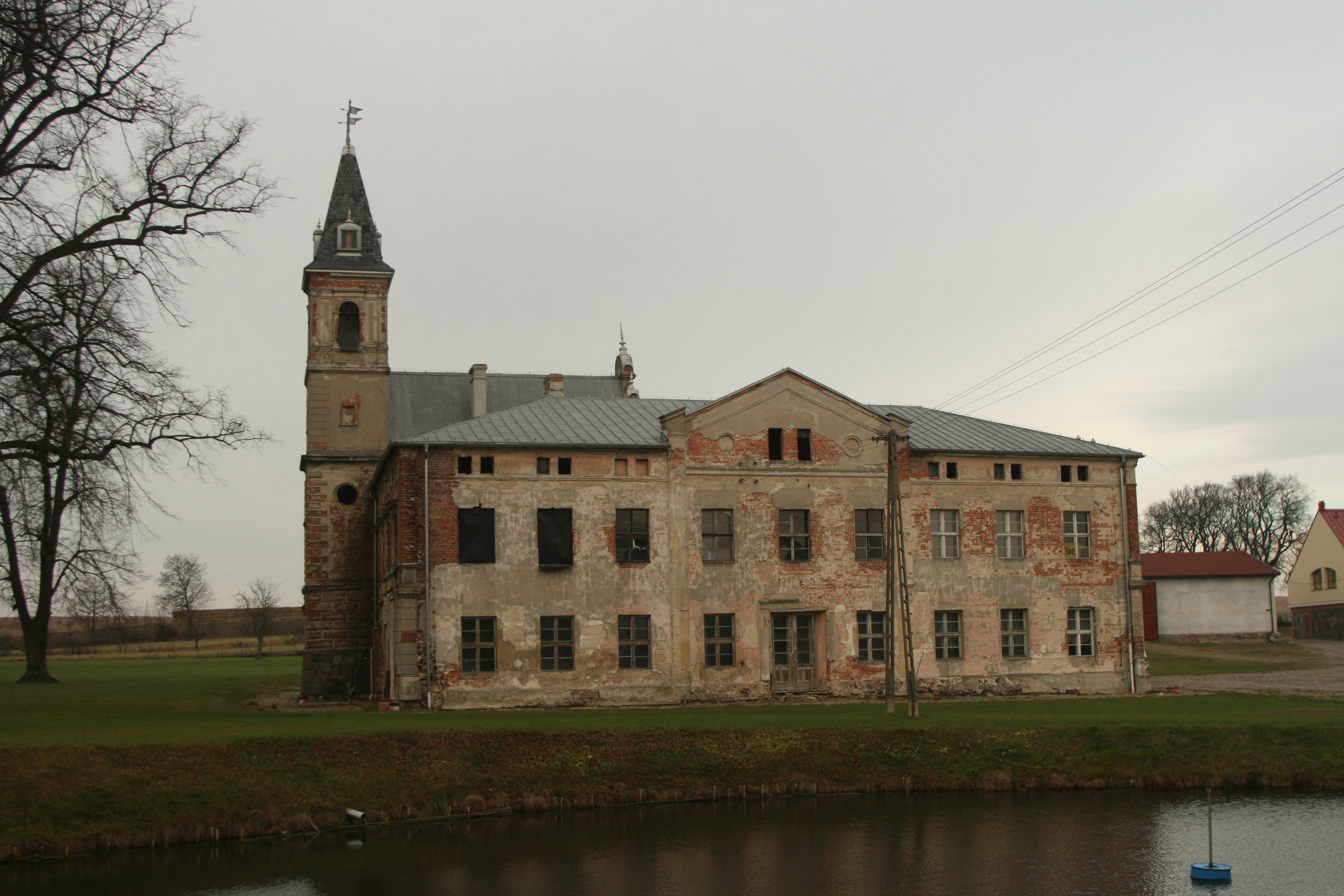
- Palace

- Location within Poland
- Coordinates: 52°43′16″N 15°2′55″E
- Country: Poland
- Voivodeship: Lubusz
- County: Gorzów
- Gmina: Bogdaniec
- Population: 390

Stanowice [stanɔˈvit͡sɛ] is a village in the administrative district of Gmina Bogdaniec, within Gorzów County, Lubusz Voivodeship, in western Poland.

== Notable residents ==
- Paul Ebel (1916–1986), German Wehrmacht soldier
