= Olbrachtów =

- Village
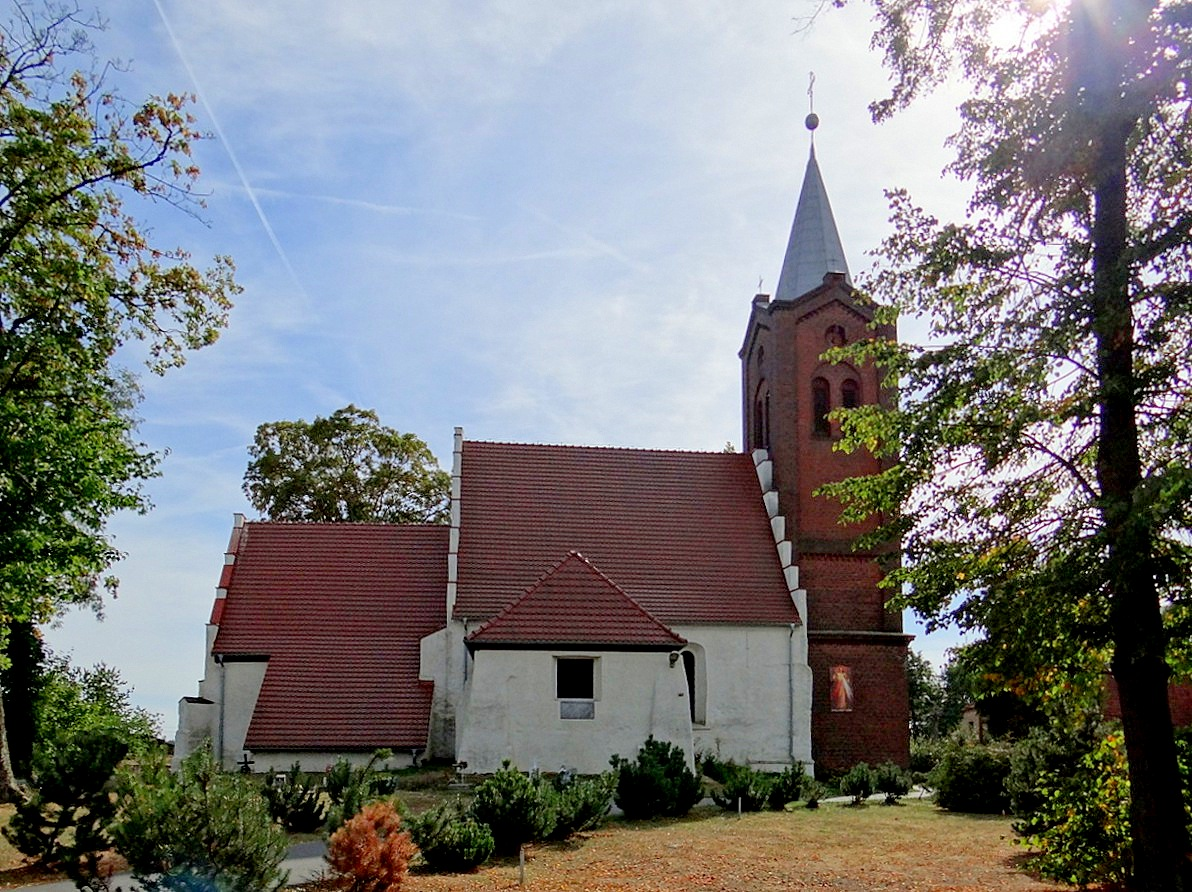
- Catholic church

- Location within Poland
- Coordinates: 51°35′N 15°5′E
- Country: Poland
- Voivodeship: Lubusz
- County: Żary
- Gmina: Żary
- Population: 780

Olbrachtów [ɔlˈbraxtuf] (Upper Sorbian: Olbrachtow, German: Albrechtsdorf) is a village in the administrative district of Gmina Żary, within Żary County, Lubusz Voivodeship, in western Poland.
