= Kadłubia =

- Village
- Location within Poland
- Coordinates: 51°39′20″N 15°10′15″E
- Country: Poland
- Voivodeship: Lubusz
- County: Żary
- Gmina: Żary

Kadłubia [kaˈdwubja] (Lower Sorbian: Štrumpy; Upper Sorbian: Rumpf) is a village in the administrative district of Gmina Żary, within Żary County, Lubusz Voivodeship, in western Poland.
