= Bogumiłów, Lubusz Voivodeship =

Bogumiłów
- Village
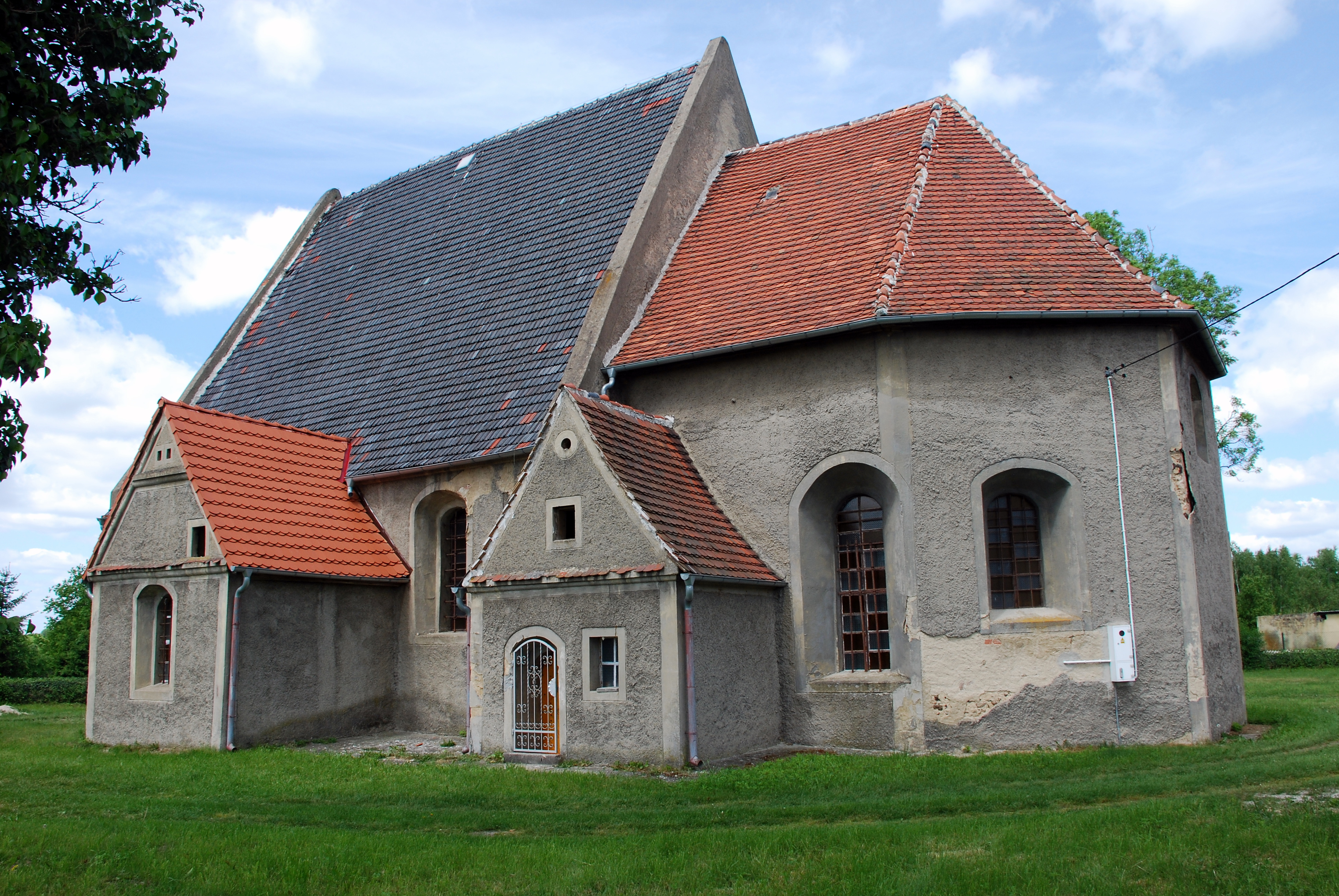
- Catholic church

- Location within Poland
- Coordinates: 51°34′15″N 15°0′33″E
- Country: Poland
- Voivodeship: Lubusz
- County: Żary
- Gmina: Żary
- Population: 230

Bogumiłów ([bɔɡuˈmiwuf]; Lower Sorbian: Bogumilov) is a village in the administrative district of Gmina Żary, within Żary County, Lubusz Voivodeship, in western Poland.
