= Gmina Żary =

Gmina Żary Żary Commune
- Gmina
- Coat of arms
- Interactive map of Gmina Żary
- Coordinates (Żary): 51°38′N 15°8′E
- Country: Poland
- Voivodeship: Lubusz
- County: Żary
- Seat: Żary

Area
  - Total: 294.43 km^{2} (113.68 sq mi)

Population (2019-06-30)
  - Total: 12,343
  - Density: 41.922/km^{2} (108.58/sq mi)
- Website: http://www.gminazary.pl

Gmina Żary is a rural gmina (administrative district) in Żary County, Lubusz Voivodeship, in western Poland. Its seat is the town of Żary, although the town is not part of the territory of the gmina.

The gmina covers an area of 294.43 square kilometres (113.7 sq mi), and as of 2019 its total population is 12,343.

== Villages ==
Gmina Żary contains the villages and settlements of Biedrzychowice Dolne, Bieniów, Bogumiłów, Dąbrowiec, Drozdów, Drożków, Grabik, Janików, Kadłubia, Łaz, Lubanice, Lubomyśl, Łukawy, Marszów, Miłowice, Mirostowice Dolne, Mirostowice Górne, Olbrachtów, Olszyniec, Rościce, Rusocice, Siodło, Stawnik, Surowa, Włostów and Złotnik.

== Neighbouring gminas ==
Gmina Żary is bordered by the towns of Żagań and Żary, and by the gminas of Iłowa, Jasień, Lipinki Łużyckie, Nowogród Bobrzański, Przewóz, Wymiarki and Żagań.

== Twin towns – sister cities ==
Gmina Żary is twinned with:

- Neuhausen/Spree, Germany
