= Lubomyśl =

- Village
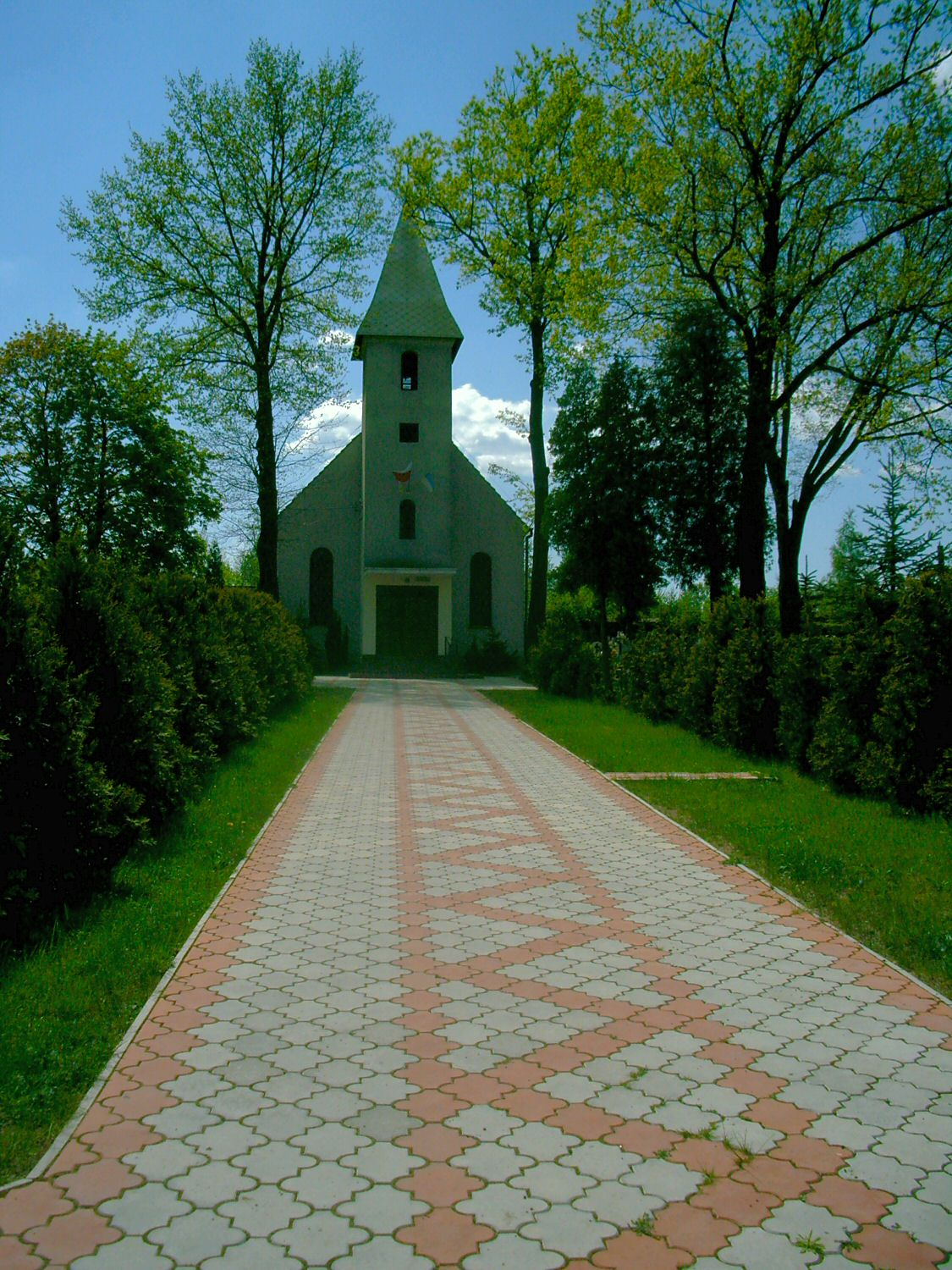

- Location within Poland
- Coordinates: 51°43′N 15°9′E
- Country: Poland
- Voivodeship: Lubusz
- County: Żary
- Gmina: Żary

Lubomyśl [luˈbɔmɨɕl] is a village in the administrative district of Gmina Żary, within Żary County, Lubusz Voivodeship, in western Poland.
