= Łaz, Żary County =

Łaz
- Village
- Location within Poland
- Coordinates: 51°35′12″N 15°07′50″E
- Country: Poland
- Voivodeship: Lubusz
- County: Żary
- Gmina: Żary
- Population: 480

Łaz [was] (Lower Sorbian: Lasisch) is a village in the administrative district of Gmina Żary, within Żary County, Lubusz Voivodeship, in western Poland.
