= Włostów, Gorzów County =

Włostów
- Village
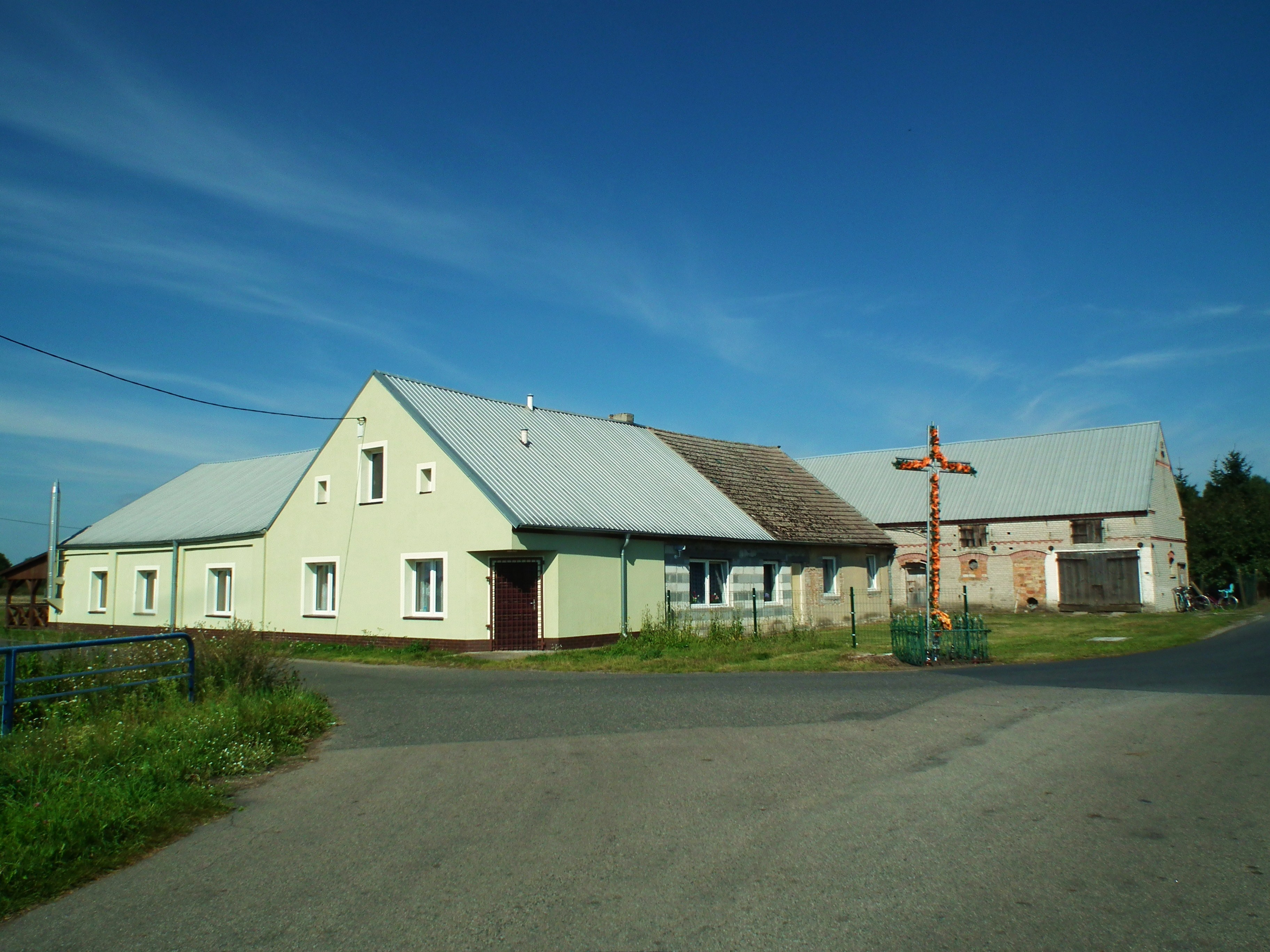

- Location within Poland
- Coordinates: 52°38′12″N 15°5′53″E
- Country: Poland
- Voivodeship: Lubusz
- County: Gorzów
- Gmina: Bogdaniec
- Population: 100

Włostów [ˈvwɔstuf] is a village in the administrative district of Gmina Bogdaniec, in Gorzów County, Lubusz Voivodeship, in western Poland. It is approximately 6 km (4 mi) south of Bogdaniec and 15 km (9 mi) south-west of Gorzów Wielkopolski.

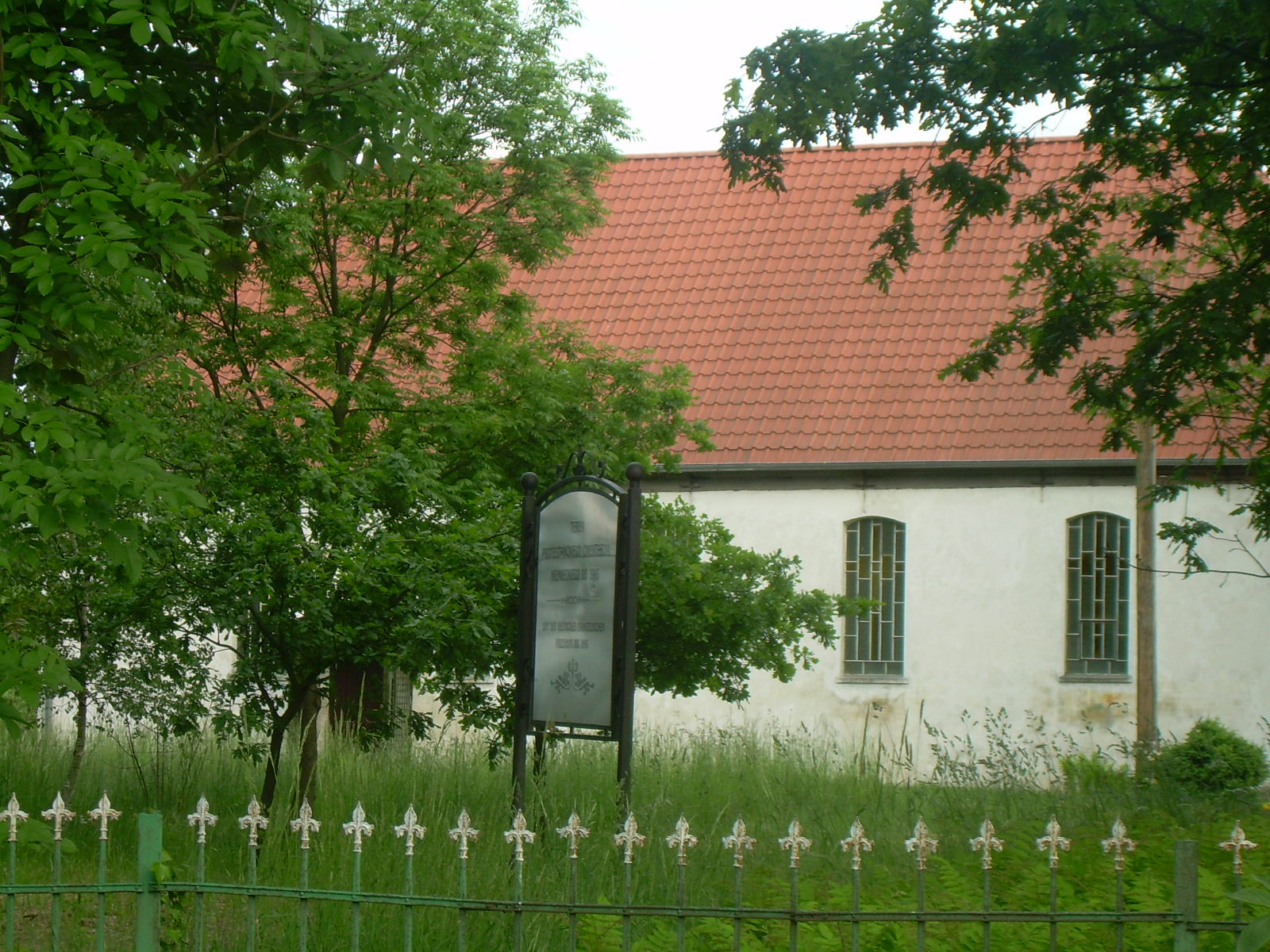
Church in Włostów
