= Drożków =

- Village
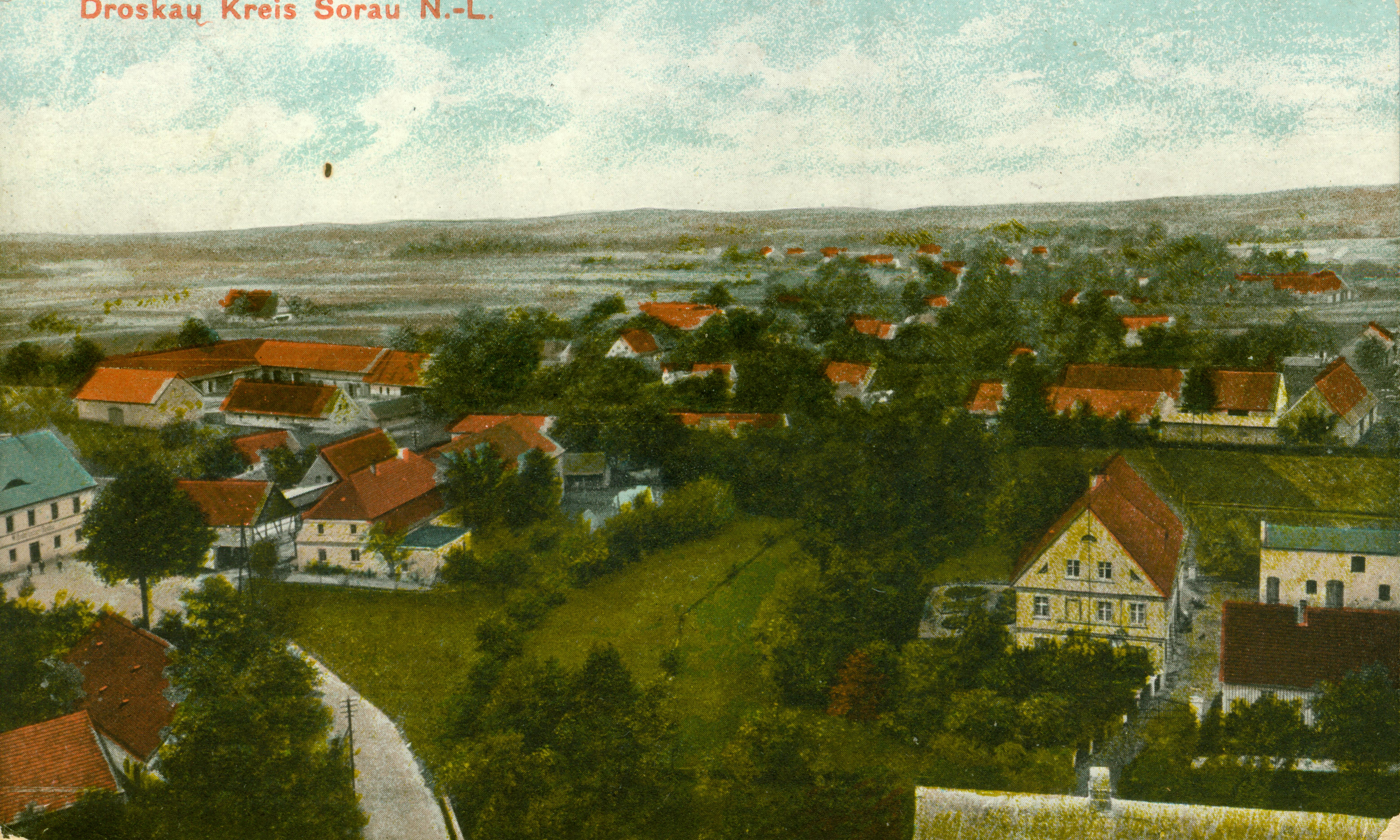

- Location within Poland
- Coordinates: 51°41′N 15°4′E
- Country: Poland
- Voivodeship: Lubusz
- County: Żary
- Gmina: Żary
- Population: 468

Drożków [ˈdrɔʂkuf] (Upper Sorbian: Drožk) is a village in the administrative district of Gmina Żary, within Żary County, Lubusz Voivodeship, in western Poland.
