= Krzyszczynka =

- Village
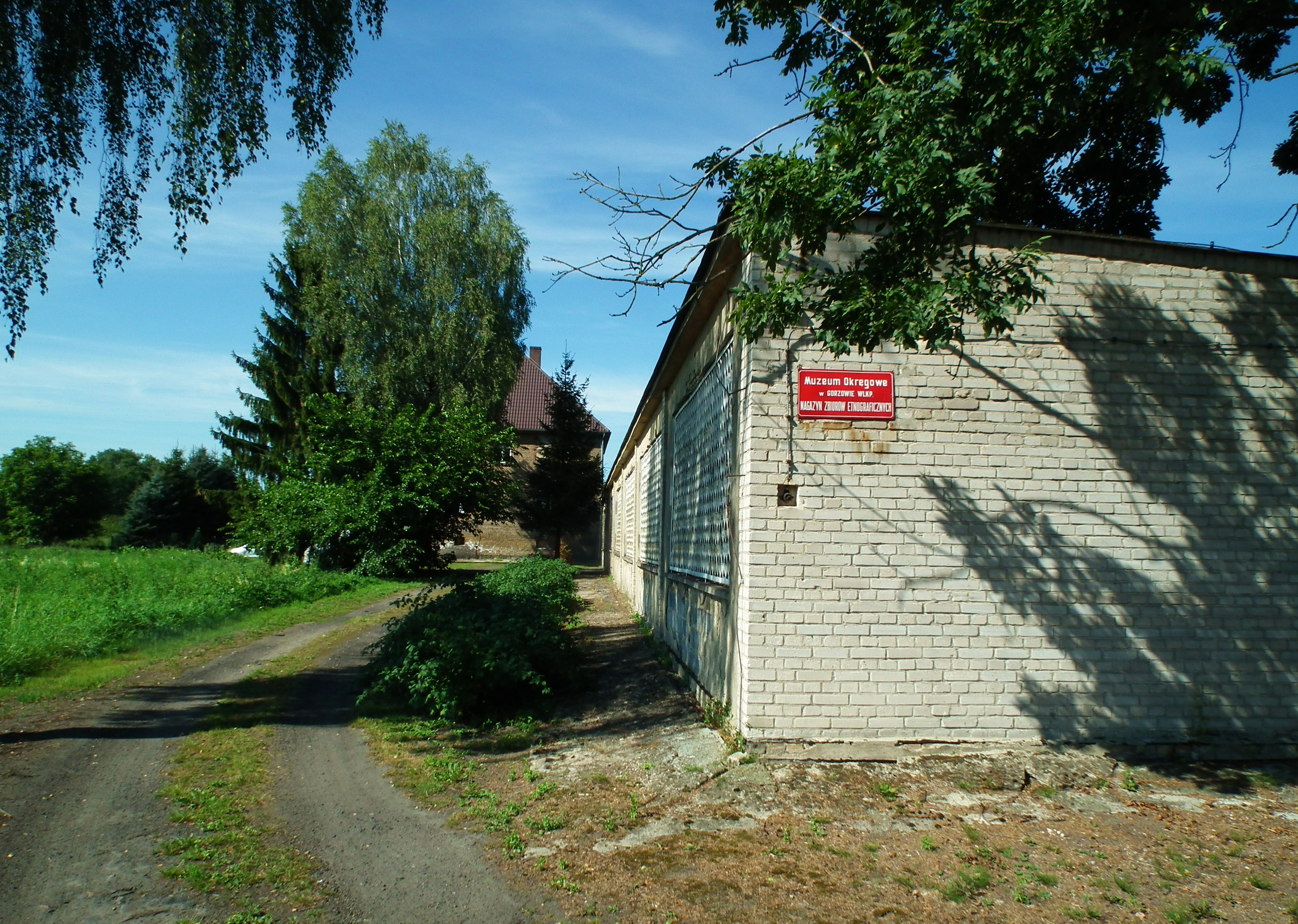

- Location within Poland
- Coordinates: 52°37′N 15°5′E
- Country: Poland
- Voivodeship: Lubusz
- County: Gorzów
- Gmina: Bogdaniec
- Population: 80

Krzyszczynka [kʂɨʂˈt͡ʂɨnka] is a village in the administrative district of Gmina Bogdaniec, within Gorzów County, Lubusz Voivodeship, in western Poland.

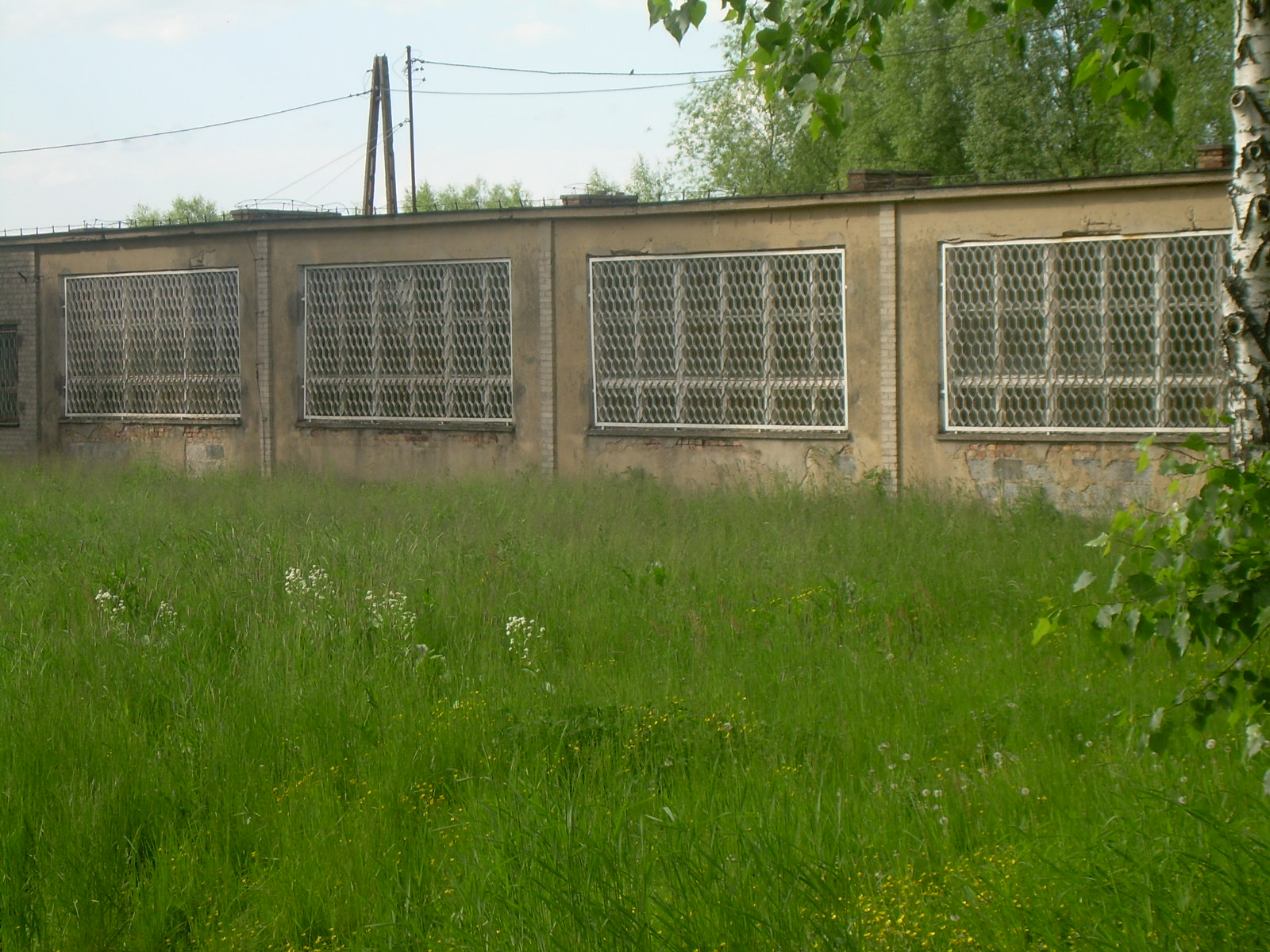
Former elementary school building, now magazines museum in Gorzow Wlkp
