= Drozdów, Lubusz Voivodeship =

Drozdów
- Village
- Location within Poland
- Coordinates: 51°34′N 15°3′E
- Country: Poland
- Voivodeship: Lubusz
- County: Żary
- Gmina: Żary

Drozdów [ˈdrɔzduf] (Upper Sorbian: Drozdow) is a village in the administrative district of Gmina Żary, within Żary County, Lubusz Voivodeship, in western Poland.
