= Jenin, Poland =

Jenin
- Village
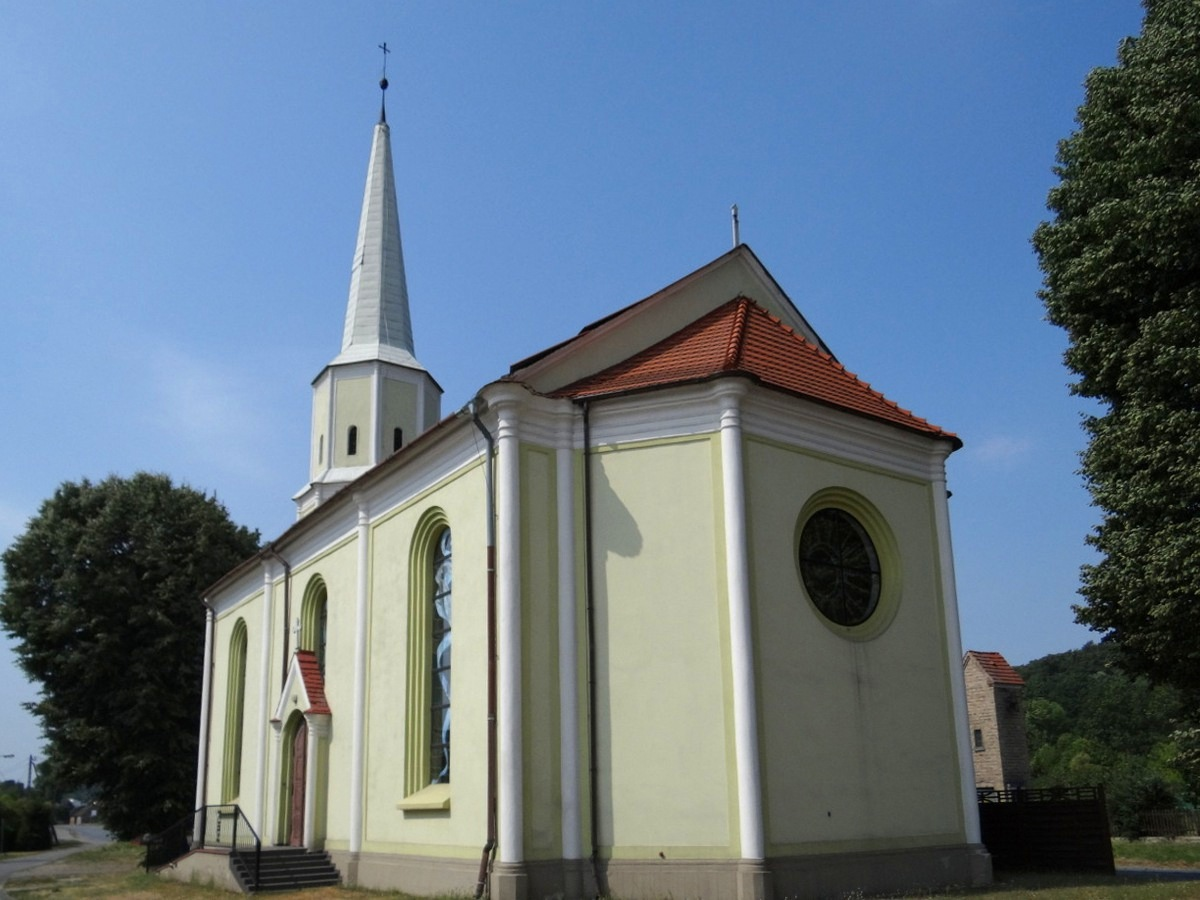
- Catholic church

- Location within Poland
- Coordinates: 52°41′N 15°5′E
- Country: Poland
- Voivodeship: Lubusz
- County: Gorzów
- Gmina: Bogdaniec
- Population: 1,100

Jenin [ˈjɛnin] is a village in the administrative district of Gmina Bogdaniec, within Gorzów County, Lubusz Voivodeship in western Poland.
