= Krzyszczyna =

- Village
- Location within Poland
- Coordinates: 52°38′26″N 15°5′1″E
- Country: Poland
- Voivodeship: Lubusz
- County: Gorzów
- Gmina: Bogdaniec
- Population: 70

Krzyszczyna [kʂɨʂˈt͡ʂɨna] is a village in the administrative district of Gmina Bogdaniec, within Gorzów County, Lubusz Voivodeship, in western Poland.
