= Biedrzychowice Dolne =

- Village
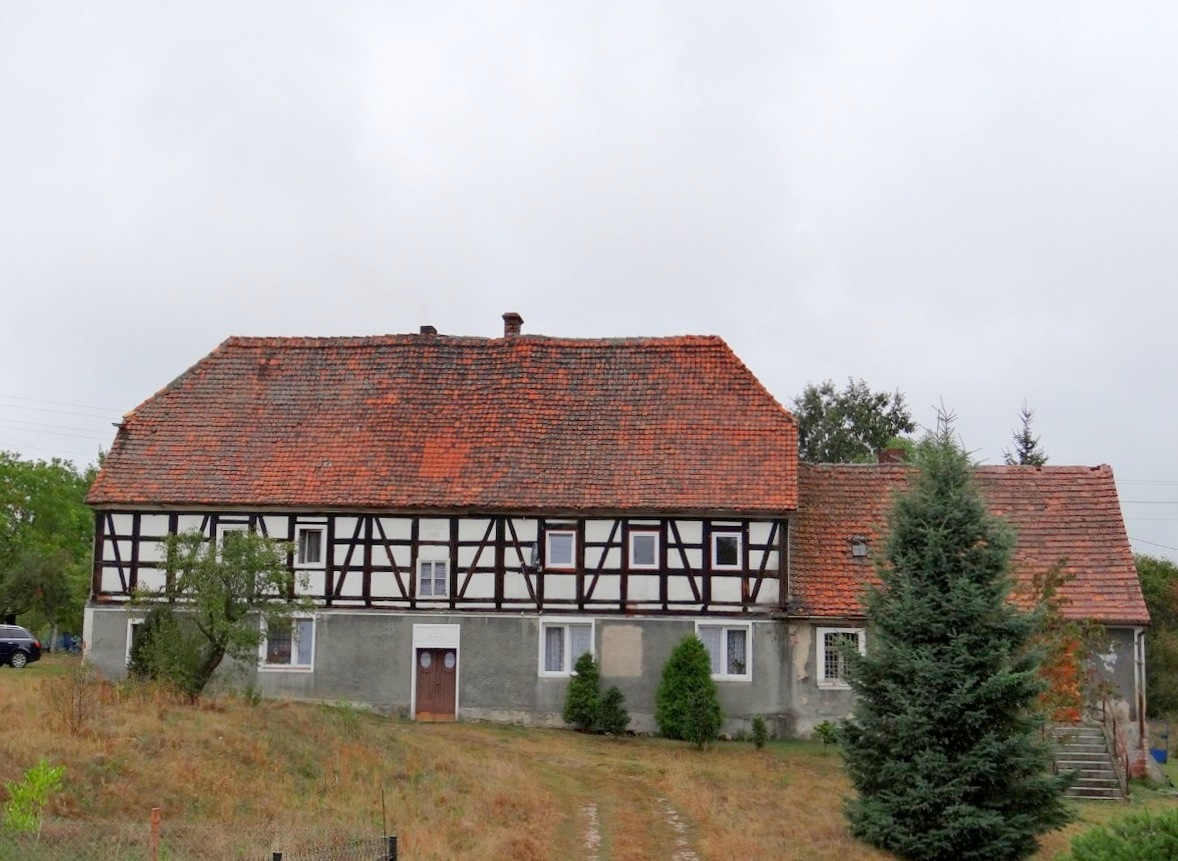

- Location within Poland
- Coordinates: 51°44′N 15°8′E
- Country: Poland
- Voivodeship: Lubusz
- County: Żary
- Gmina: Żary

Biedrzychowice Dolne [bjɛdʐɨxɔˈvit͡sɛ ˈdɔlnɛ] is a village in the administrative district of Gmina Żary, within Żary County, Lubusz Voivodeship, in western Poland.
