= Rusocice, Lubusz Voivodeship =

Rusocice
- Village
- Location within Poland
- Coordinates: 51°33′28″N 15°2′30″E
- Country: Poland
- Voivodeship: Lubusz
- County: Żary
- Gmina: Żary
- Population: 40

Rusocice [rusɔˈt͡ɕit͡sɛ] is a village in the administrative district of Gmina Żary, within Żary County, Lubusz Voivodeship, in western Poland.
