= Łupowo, Lubusz Voivodeship =

Łupowo
- Village
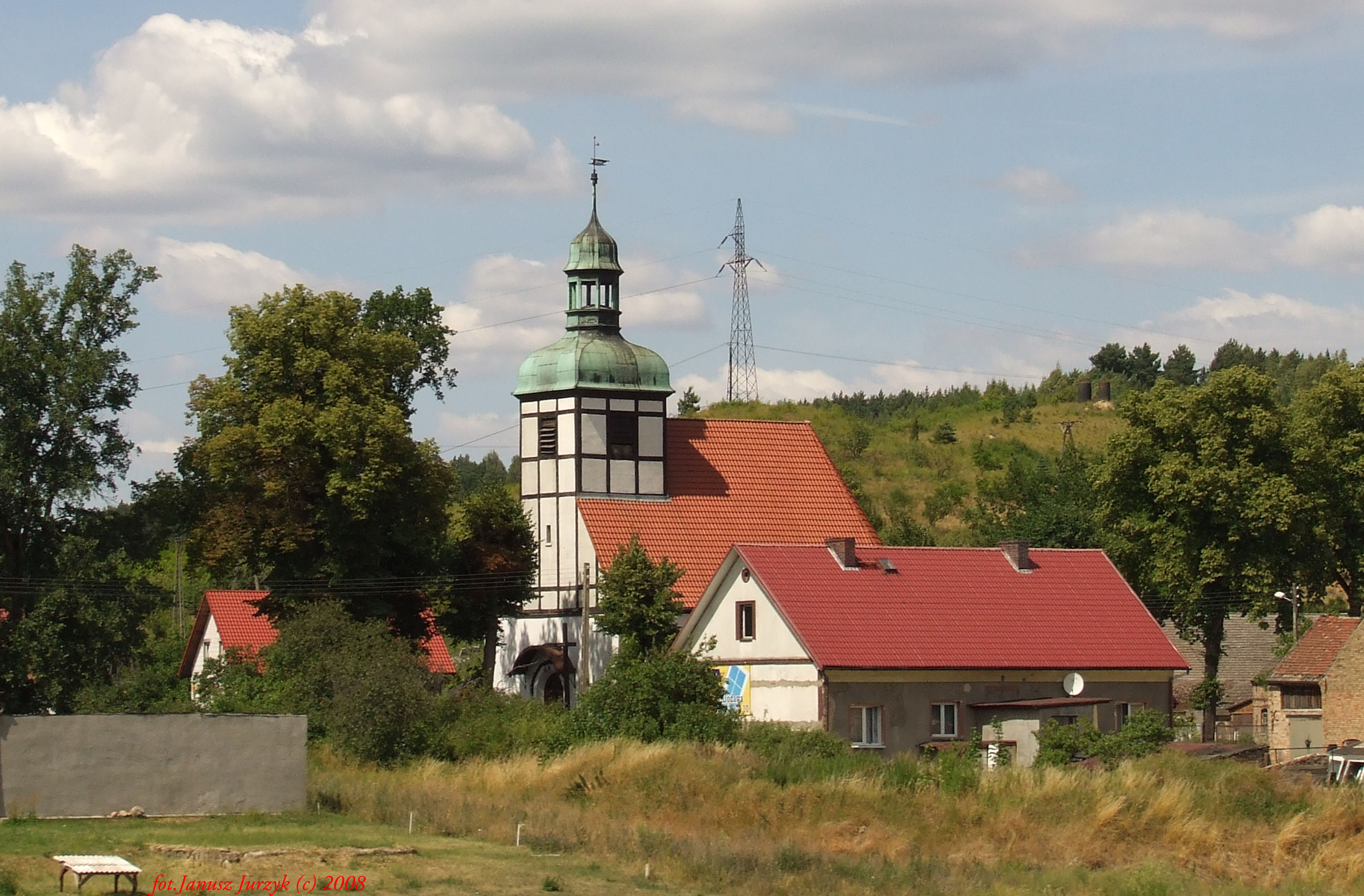

- Location within Poland
- Coordinates: 52°42′N 15°7′E
- Country: Poland
- Voivodeship: Lubusz
- County: Gorzów
- Gmina: Bogdaniec
- Population: 840

Łupowo [wuˈpɔvɔ] is a village in the administrative district of Gmina Bogdaniec, within Gorzów County, Lubusz Voivodeship, in western Poland.

== Notable residents ==
- Hermann Teuchert (1880–1972), German historical linguist
