= Dąbrowiec, Lubusz Voivodeship =

Dąbrowiec
- Village
- Location within Poland
- Coordinates: 51°45′N 15°12′E
- Country: Poland
- Voivodeship: Lubusz
- County: Żary
- Gmina: Żary
- Population: 80

Dąbrowiec [dɔmˈbrɔvjɛt͡s] is a village in the administrative district of Gmina Żary, within Żary County, Lubusz Voivodeship, in western Poland.
