= Marszów =

- Village
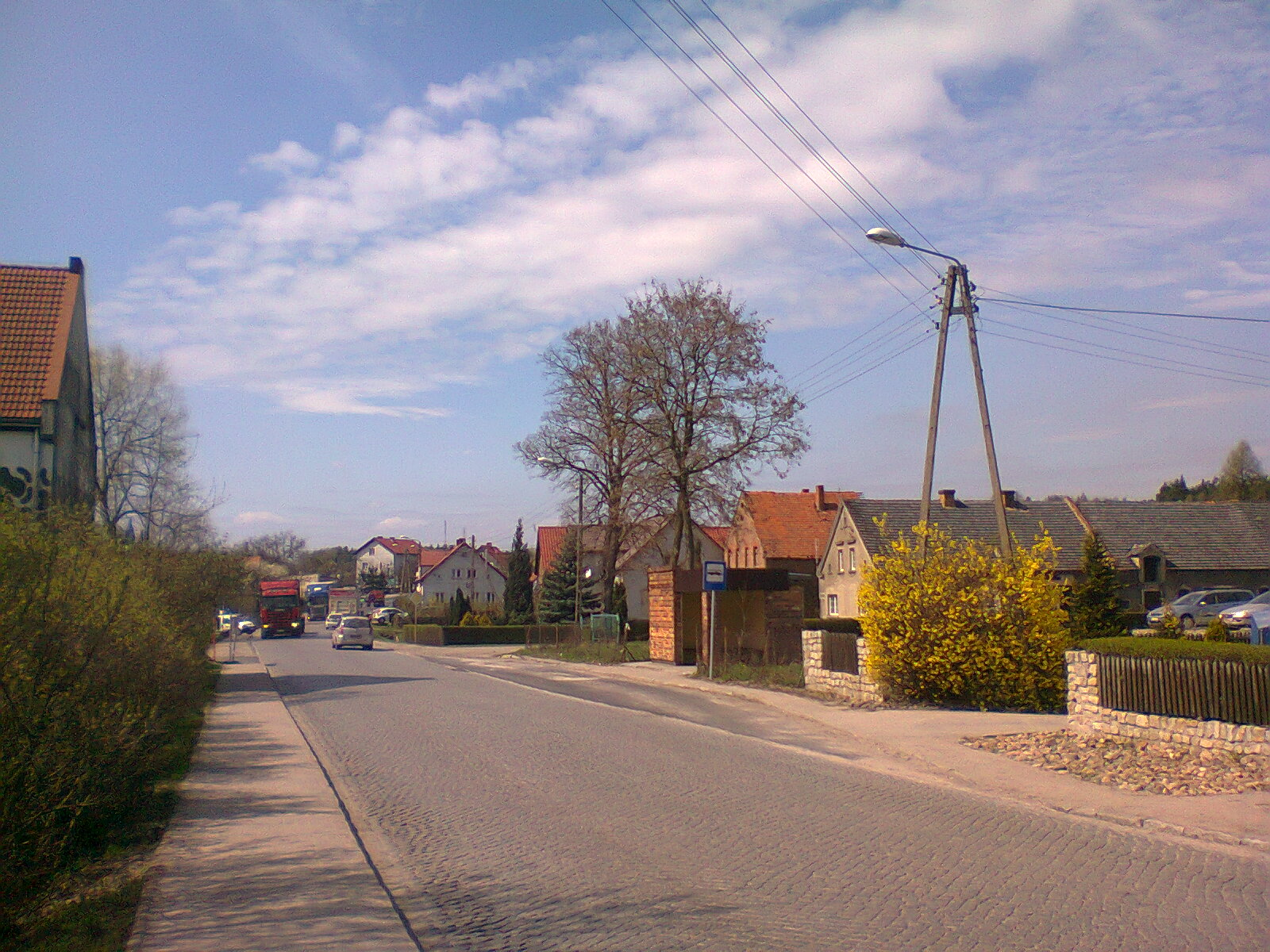
- Village in Western Poland

- Location within Poland
- Coordinates: 51°38′N 15°12′E
- Country: Poland
- Voivodeship: Lubusz
- County: Żary
- Gmina: Żary

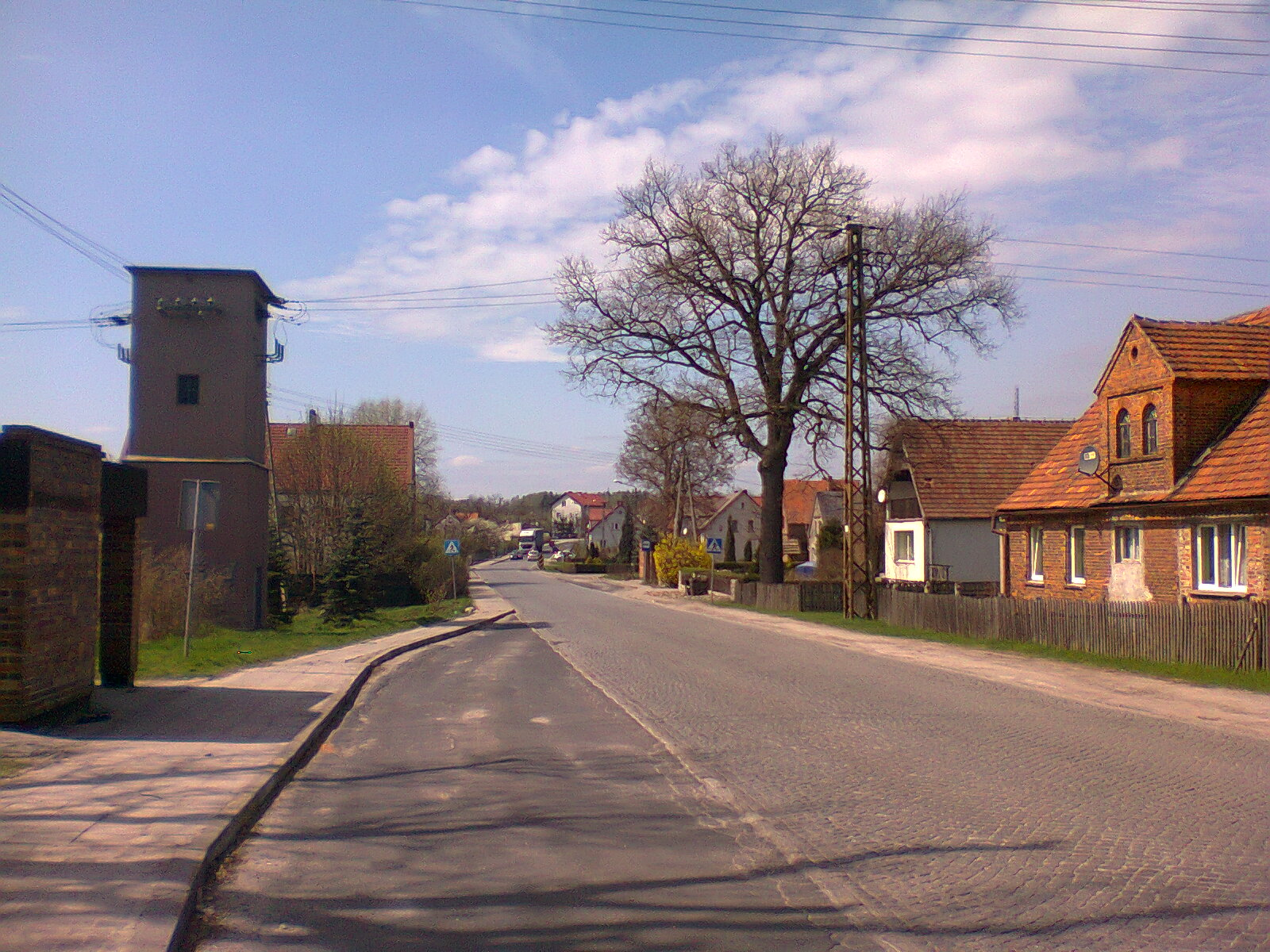
Marszów, central road

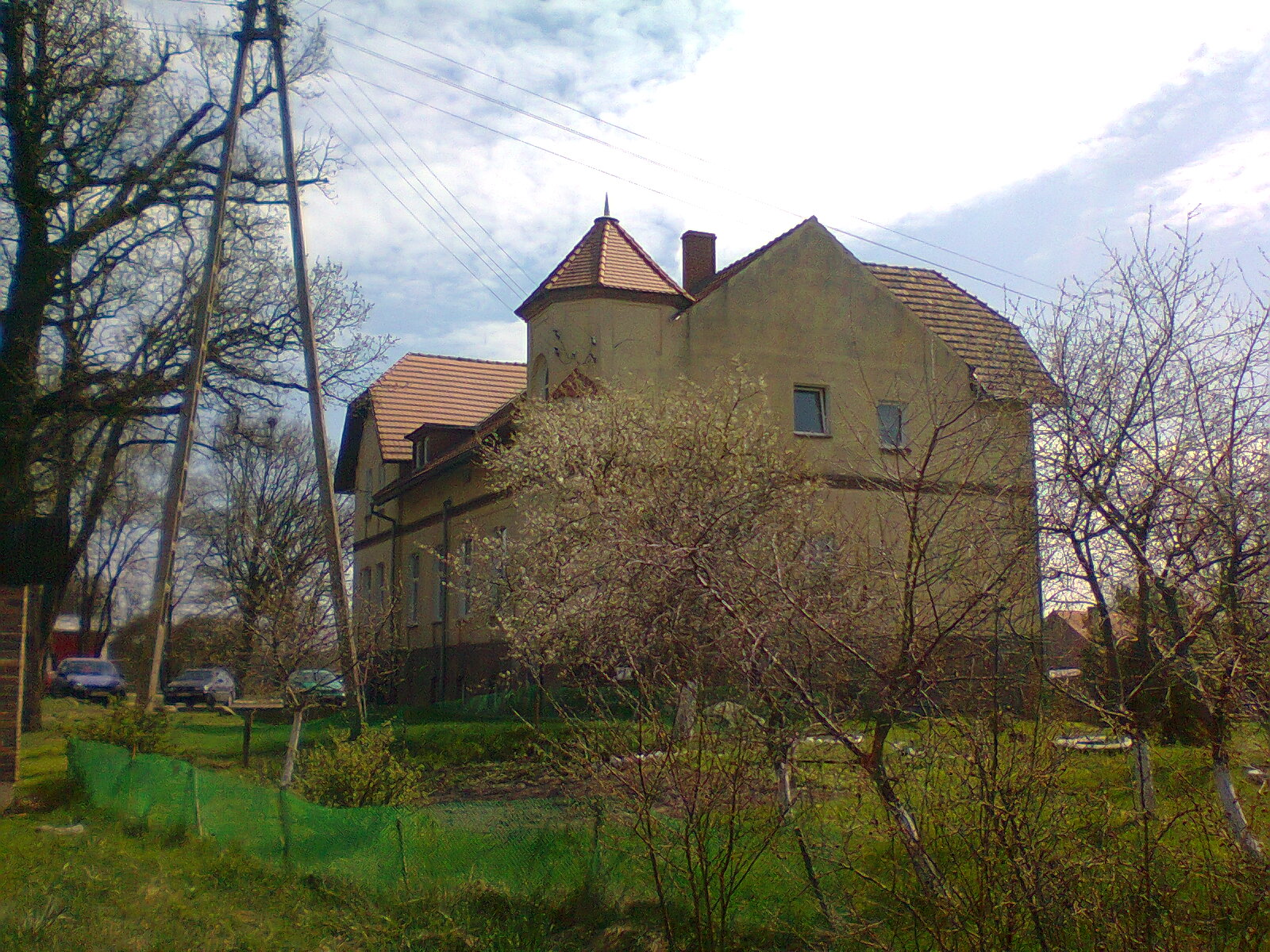
Marszów, central part

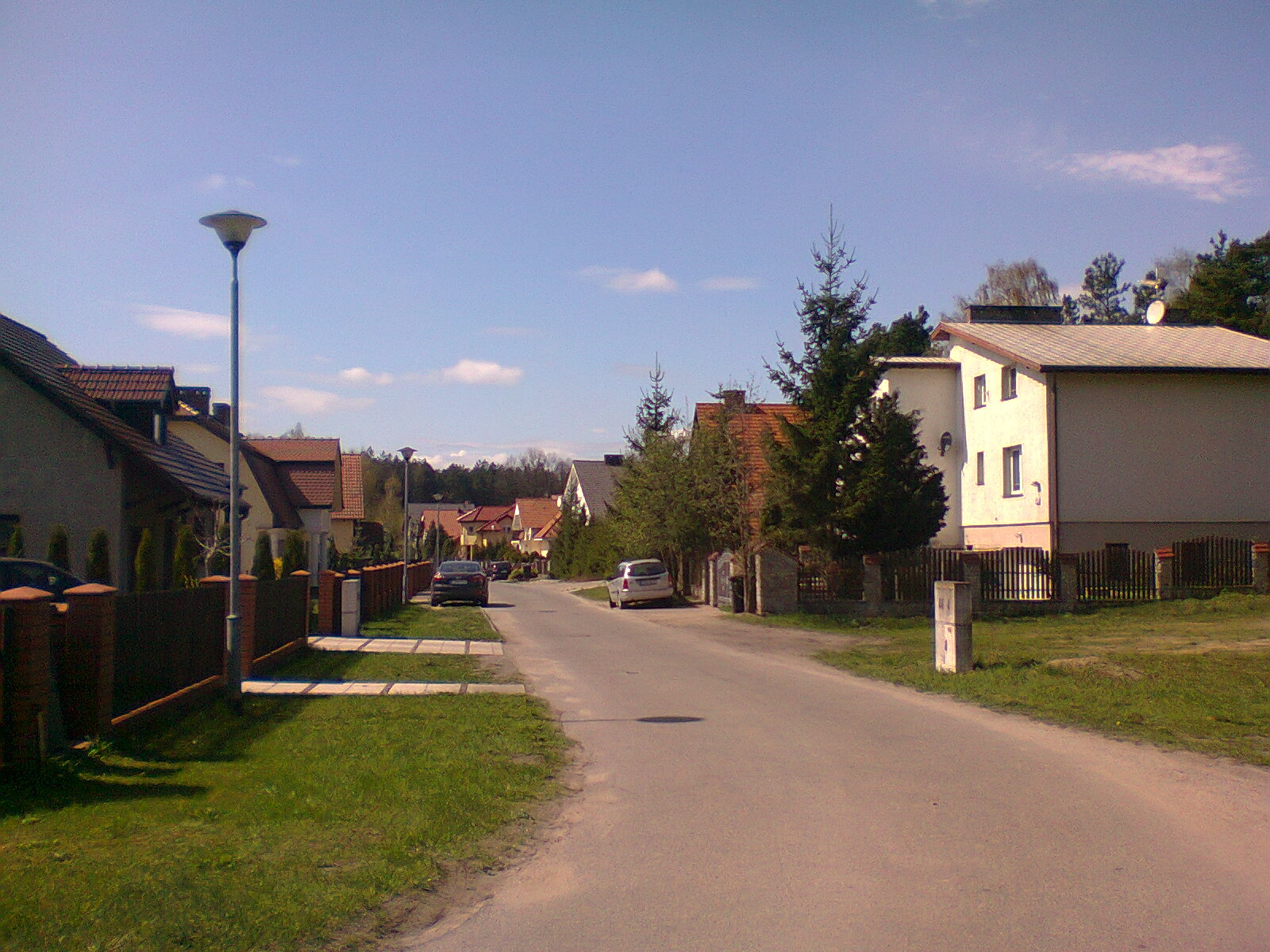
Marszów, Leśna Street

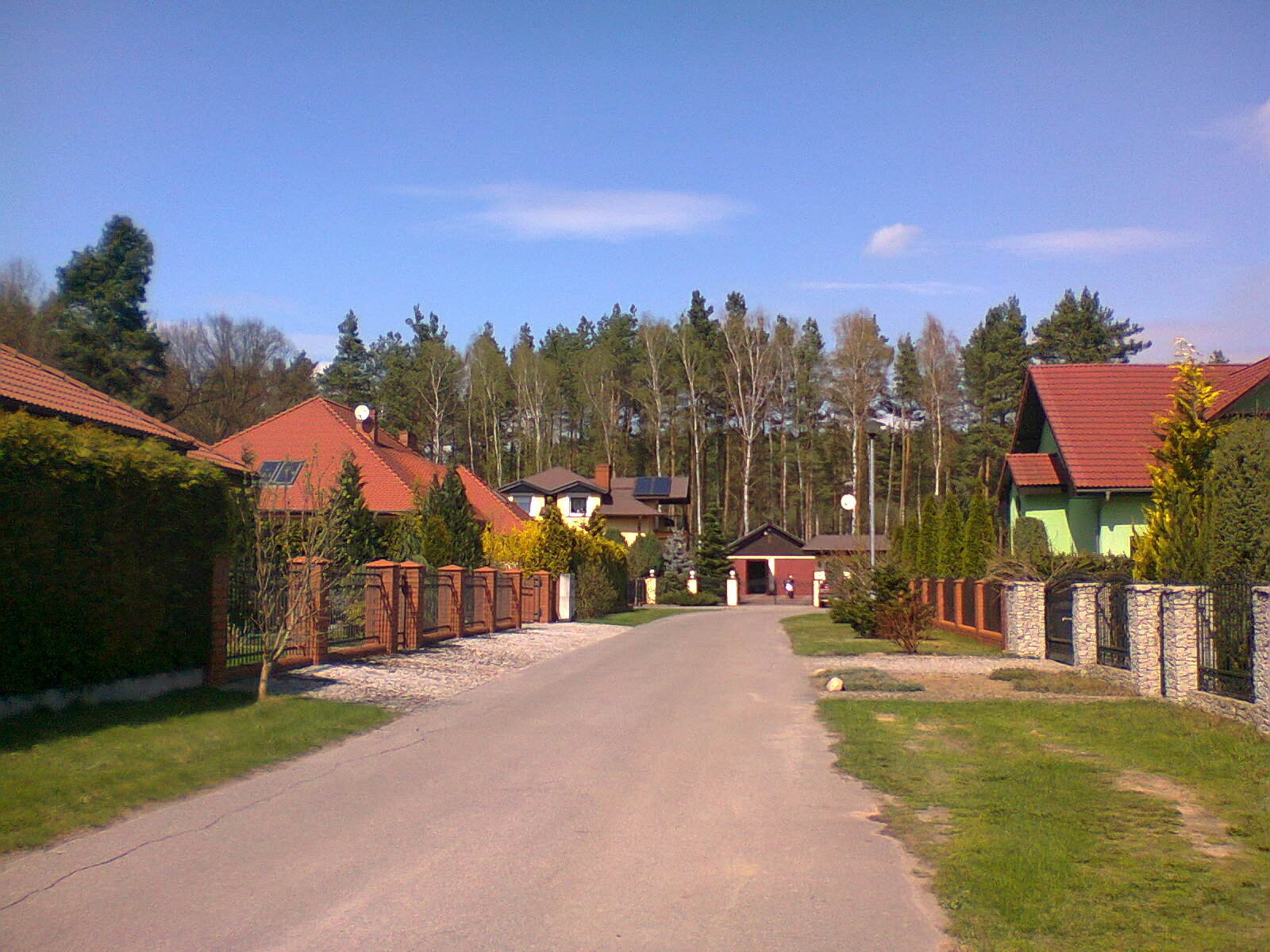
Marszów, Leśna Street

Marszów (Polish: [ˈmarʂuf]; Lower Sorbian: Marken) is a village in the administrative district of Gmina Żary, within Żary County, Lubusz Voivodeship, in western Poland.
