= Jeniniec =

- Village
- Location within Poland
- Coordinates: 52°39′N 15°5′E
- Country: Poland
- Voivodeship: Lubusz
- County: Gorzów
- Gmina: Bogdaniec
- Population: 310

Jeniniec [jɛˈniɲɛt͡s] is a village in the administrative district of Gmina Bogdaniec, within Gorzów County, Lubusz Voivodeship, in western Poland.
