= Siodło, Lubusz Voivodeship =

Siodło
- Village
- Location within Poland
- Coordinates: 51°35′54″N 15°12′39″E
- Country: Poland
- Voivodeship: Lubusz
- County: Żary
- Gmina: Żary

Siodło [ˈɕɔdwɔ] (Lower Sorbian: Sedło) is a village in the administrative district of Gmina Żary, within Żary County, Lubusz Voivodeship, in western Poland.
