= Wolfgang Teuchert =

German art historian

Wolfgang Teuchert (17 March 1924 − 27 July 2010) was a German art historian and historic preservationist.

== Life ==
Born in Rostock, Teuchert grew up in Rostock, his father was the Germanist Hermann Teuchert. He first studied at the University of Rostock and moved to the University of Kiel. There he was awarded the title Die Baugeschichte der Petrikirche zu Lübeck in 1953 with Richard Sedlmaier. Doctor doctorate. From 1954 until his retirement in 1989 he worked for the Landesamt für Denkmalpflege Schleswig-Holstein in Kiel. From 1965 he was head of the department for cultural monuments in church ownership, from 1972 also as deputy Landeskonservator.

Teuchert died in Kiel at the age of 86.

== Publications ==
- Die Baugeschichte der Petrikirche zu Lübeck. Schmidt-Römhild, Lübeck 1956 (Dissertation University of Kiel 1953).
- with Dietrich Ellger (contribution.): Die Kunstdenkmäler des Landkreises Schleswig ohne die Stadt Schleswig. With contributions from Friedrich Saeftel, Harry Schmidt and Jacob Nagel. Deutscher Kunstverlag, Munich/Berlin 1957.
- with Werner Waßner, Erich Märtz: Stadtkirche in Neustadt · Holstein. Kirchengemeinde Neustadt in Holstein, WFB-Druck, Oldenburg/Holstein 1957.
- with Arnold Lühning: Die Kunstdenkmäler des Kreises Pinneberg. Deutscher Kunstverlag, Munich/Berlin 1961.
- Sankt Nikolai zu Mölln. Deutscher Kunstverlag, München 1968. New editions 1972, 1976, 1980, 1985, 1986, 1987.
- Die Stadtkirche zu Neustadt in Holstein. Deutscher Kunstverlag, Munich/Berlin 1974. New editions 1982, 1987, 1992.
- (Text and editing.): Der Dom in Schleswig. Langewiesche, Königstein im Taunus 1981?, ISBN 3-7845-1395-6. New edition 1991, ISBN 3-7845-1397-2.
- Taufen in Schleswig-Holstein. Taufen in Stein, Bronze u. Holz vom Mittelalter bis zur Gegenwart. Boyens, Heide 1986, ISBN 3-8042-0365-5.
- with Johannes Habich: Private Denkmalpflege. Wachholtz, Neumünster 1993.
- Die Kirche von Altenkrempe. Deutscher Kunstverlag, Munich/Berlin 1989. Neuauflagen 1990, 1993.
  Basilika Altenkrempe. Deutscher Kunstverlag, Munich/Berlin 1996, 200, 2009, ISBN 978-3-422-02211-9.

== Literature ==
- Johannes Habich: Dr. Wolfgang Teuchert zum 75. Geburtstag. In DenkMal! Zeitschrift für Denkmalpflege in Schleswig-Holstein. 6, 1999, pp. 102–103.
- Deert Lafrenz: Verspätetes zu Wolfgang Teucherts 80. Geburtstag. In DenkMal! Zeitschrift für Denkmalpflege in Schleswig-Holstein. 12, 2005, p. 64.
- Deert Lafrenz: Verzeichnis der Schriften Wolfgang Teucherts. In DenkMal! Zeitschrift für Denkmalpflege in Schleswig-Holstein. 12, 2005, pp. .104–106.
