= Gerhard Wietek =

German art historian (1923–2012)

Gerhard Wietek (23 June 1923, in Tscherbeney – 28 May 2012, in Hamburg) was a German art historian who served as the museum director at the State Museum of Art and Cultural History of Schleswig-Holstein at the Gottorf Castle. His academic work focused on the works of Karl Schmidt-Rottluff and the genre of expressionism.
