= Olszyniec, Lubusz Voivodeship =

Olszyniec
- Village
- Location within Poland
- Coordinates: 51°39′28″N 15°14′18″E
- Country: Poland
- Voivodeship: Lubusz
- County: Żary
- Gmina: Żary
- Population: 350

Olszyniec [ɔlˈʂɨɲɛt͡s] is a village in the administrative district of Gmina Żary, within Żary County, Lubusz Voivodeship, in western Poland.
