= Jeże, Lubusz Voivodeship =

Jeże
- Village
- Location within Poland
- Coordinates: 52°42′N 15°11′E
- Country: Poland
- Voivodeship: Lubusz
- County: Gorzów
- Gmina: Bogdaniec

Jeże [ˈjɛʐɛ] is a village in the administrative district of Gmina Bogdaniec, within Gorzów County, Lubusz Voivodeship, in western Poland.
