= Wieprzyce Dolne =

- Village
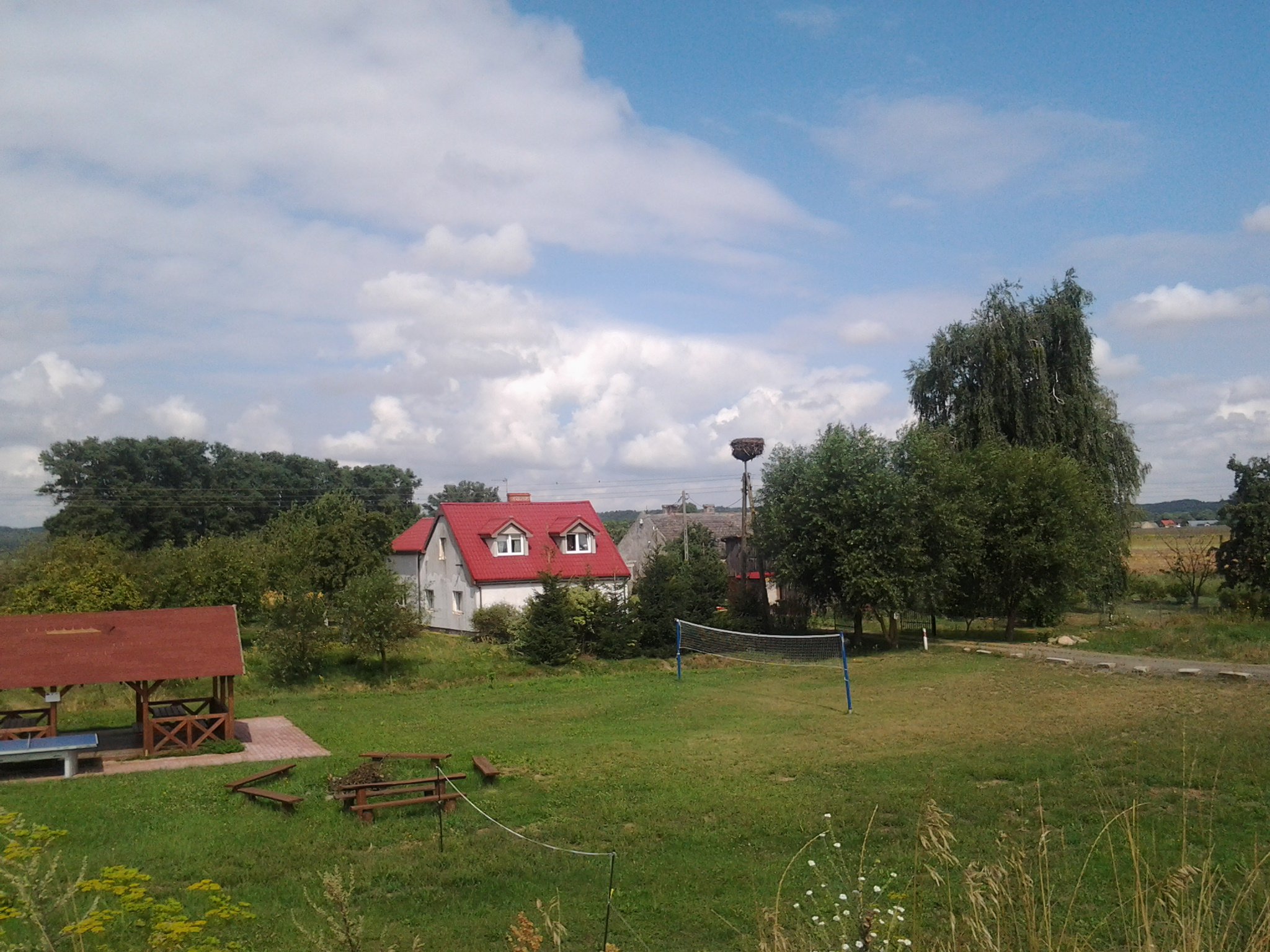

- Location within Poland
- Coordinates: 52°41′N 15°10′E
- Country: Poland
- Voivodeship: Lubusz
- County: Gorzów
- Gmina: Bogdaniec
- Population: 190

Wieprzyce Dolne [vjɛˈpʂɨt͡sɛ ˈdɔlnɛ] is a village in the administrative district of Gmina Bogdaniec, within Gorzów County, Lubusz Voivodeship, in western Poland.
