= Bogdaniec, Lubusz Voivodeship =

Bogdaniec
- Village
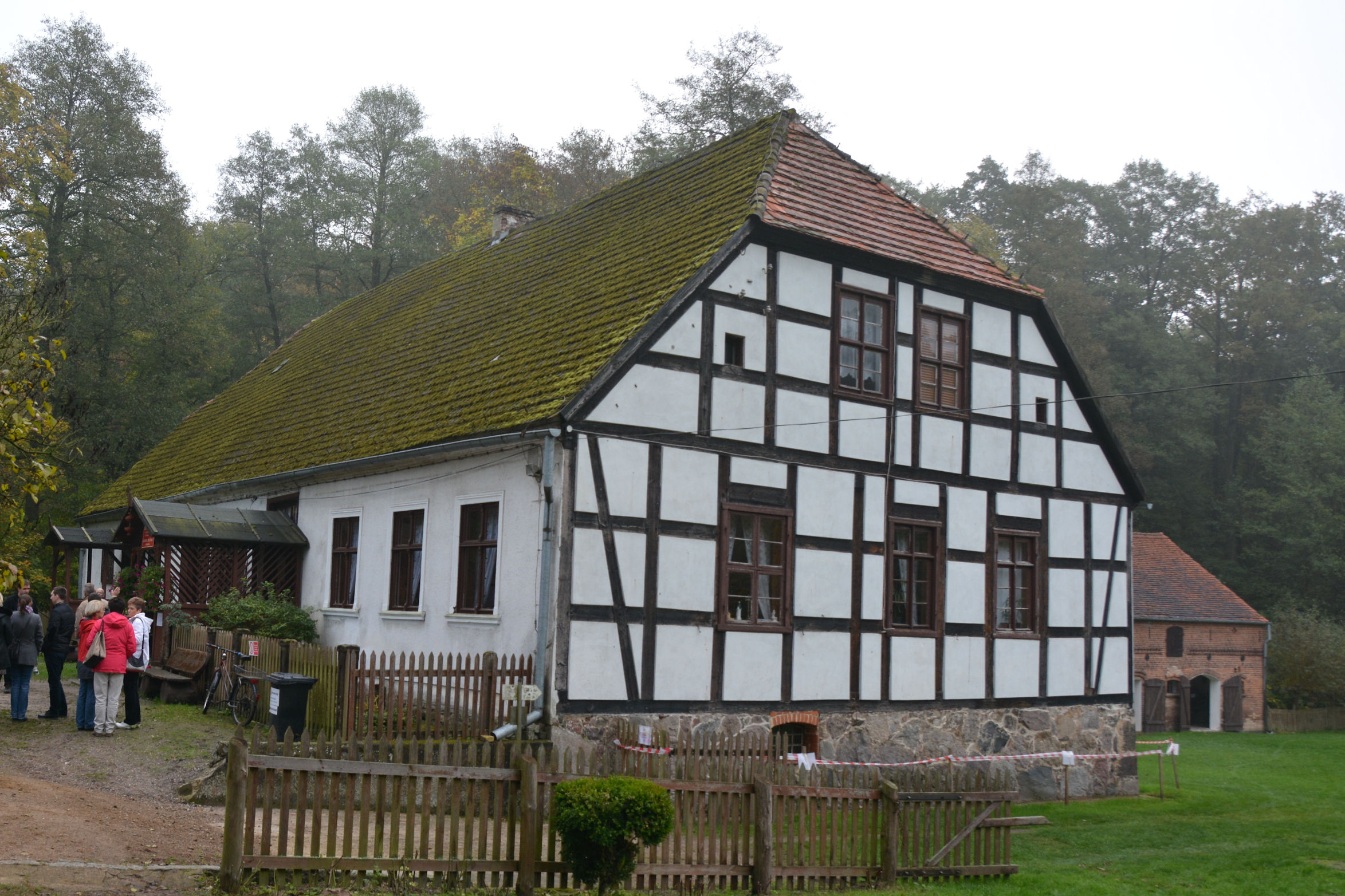
- Local museum

- Location within Poland
- Coordinates: 52°41′N 15°4′E
- Country: Poland
- Voivodeship: Lubusz
- County: Gorzów
- Gmina: Bogdaniec
- Population: 1,100
- Website: http://www.bogdaniec.pl/

Bogdaniec [bɔɡˈdaɲɛt͡s] is a village in Gorzów County, Lubusz Voivodeship, in western Poland. It is the seat of the gmina (administrative district) called Gmina Bogdaniec.
