= Włostów, Żary County =

Włostów
- Village
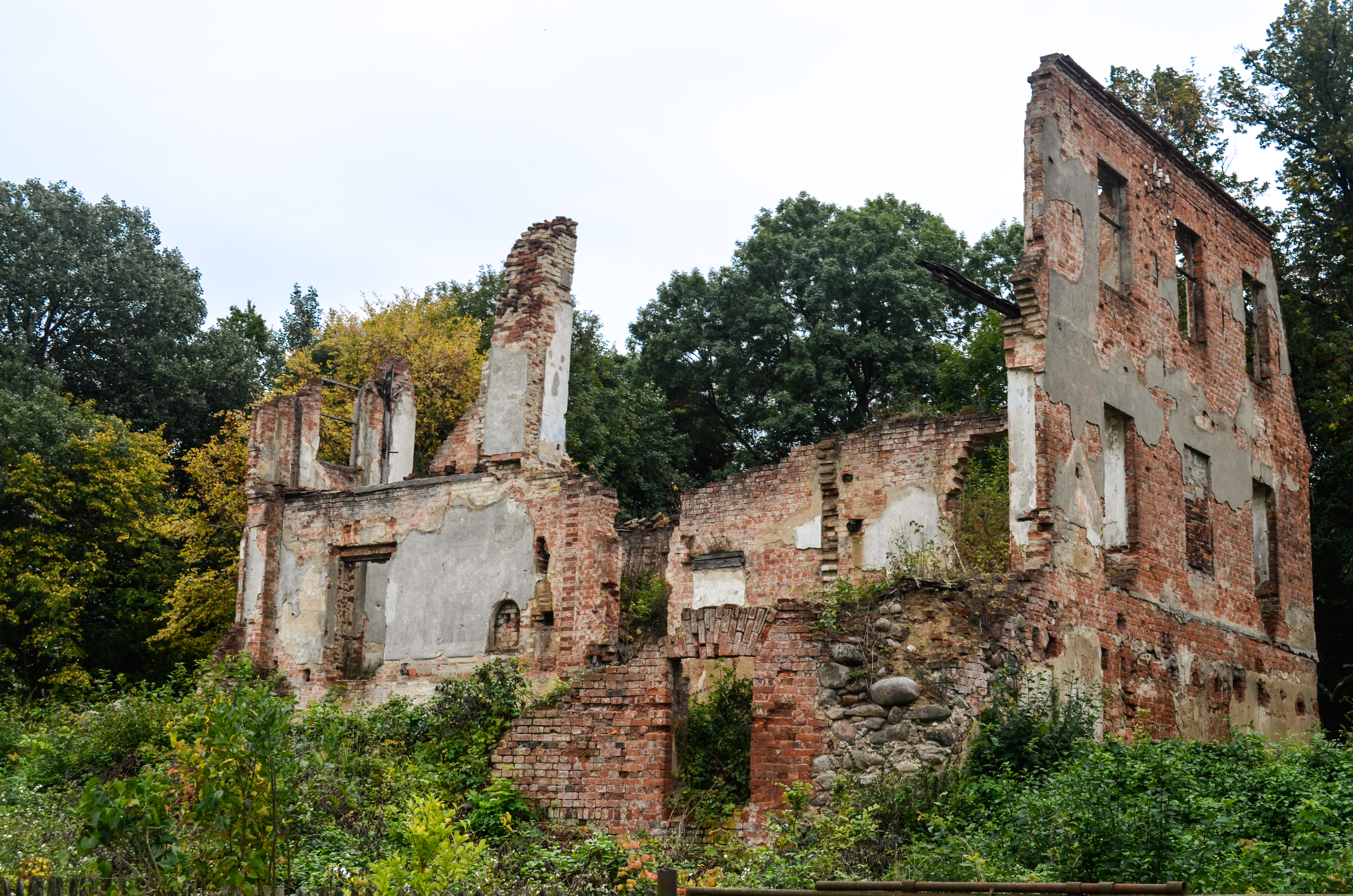
- Palace ruins

- Location within Poland
- Coordinates: 51°45′N 15°11′E
- Country: Poland
- Voivodeship: Lubusz
- County: Żary
- Gmina: Żary

Włostów [ˈvwɔstuf] is a village in the administrative district of Gmina Żary, within Żary County, Lubusz Voivodeship, in western Poland.
