= Hermann Teuchert =

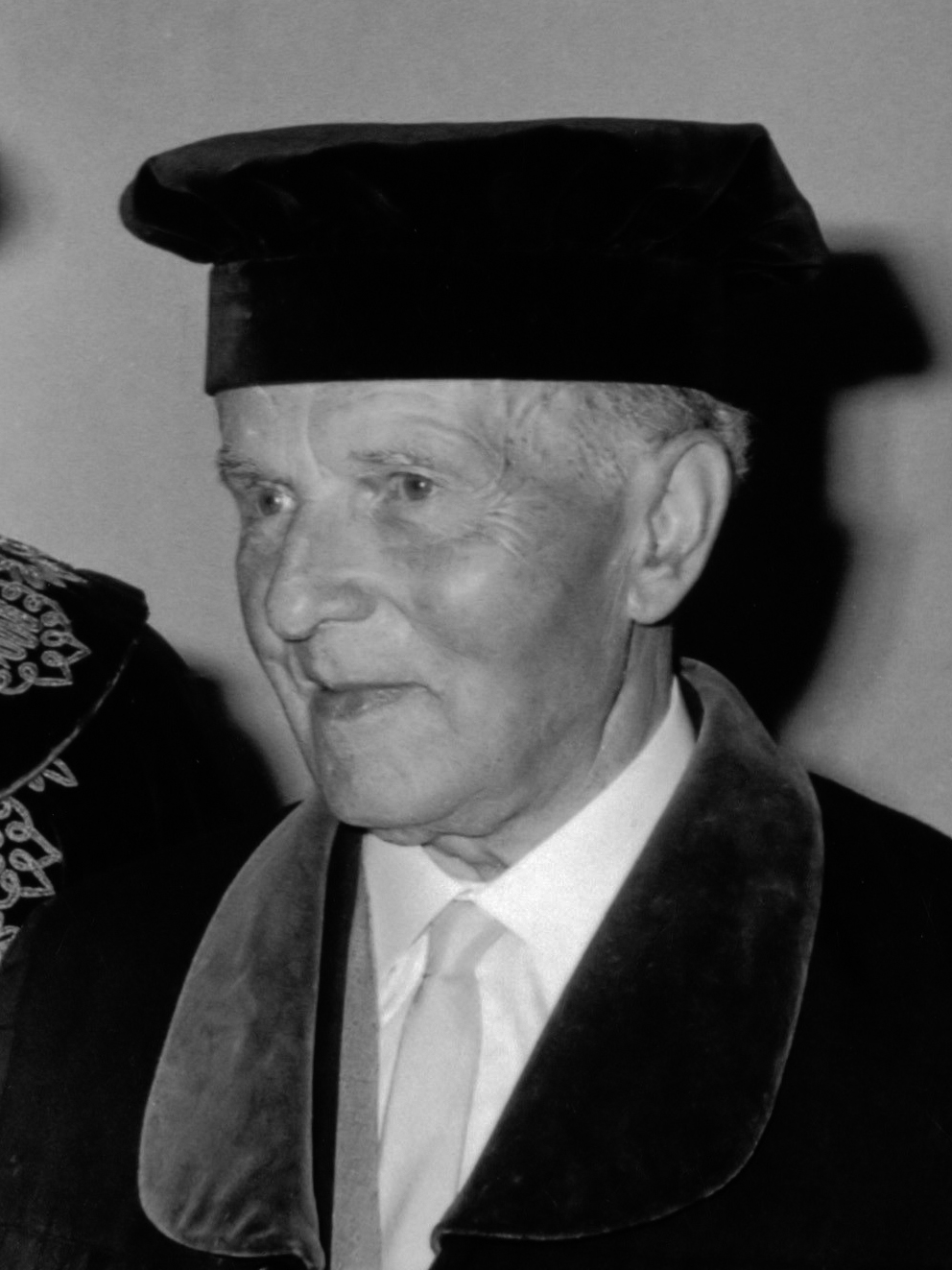
Hermann Teuchert (1964)

Hermann August Teuchert (3 March 1880 − 13 January 1972) was a German historical linguist.

Teuchert was born in Loppow (Neumark) In 1920 he was granted the newly created professorship for Low German Philology at the University of Rostock and served in this position until 1946. He died in Heidelberg at the age of 91.

His son was the art historian Wolfgang Teuchert.

== Bibliography ==
- Mecklenburgisches Wörterbuch
- Brandenburg-Berlinisches Wörterbuch
- Niederdeutsche Mundarten, 1933
- Der mecklenburgische Sprachraum, 1929
- Die Sprachreste der niederländischen Siedlungen des 12. Jahrhunderts, 1944 – Language remnants from Dutch settlements of the 12th century.
