= Miłowice, Lubusz Voivodeship =

Miłowice
- Village
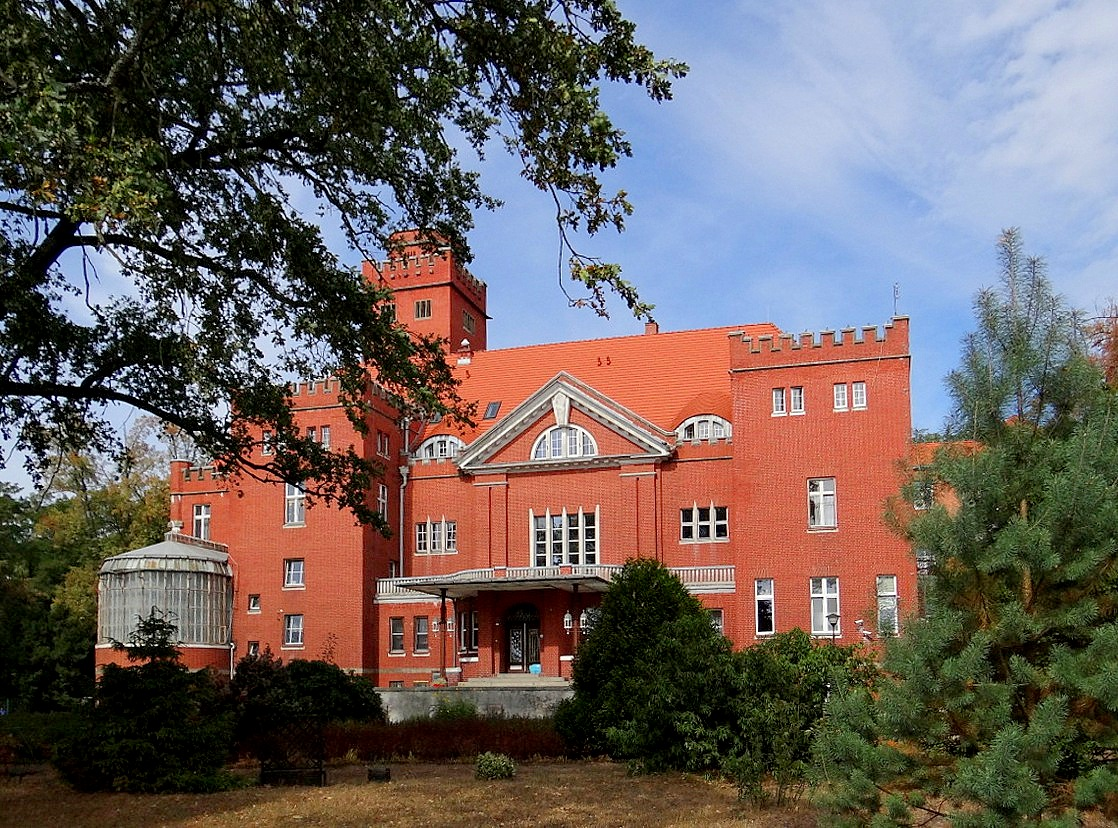
- Palace

- Location within Poland
- Coordinates: 51°36′N 15°3′E
- Country: Poland
- Voivodeship: Lubusz
- County: Żary
- Gmina: Żary
- Time zone: UTC+1 (CET)
  - Summer (DST): UTC+2 (CEST)
- Vehicle registration: FZA

Miłowice [miwɔˈvit͡sɛ] is a village in the administrative district of Gmina Żary, within Żary County, Lubusz Voivodeship, in western Poland.
