= Ciecierzyce =

- Village
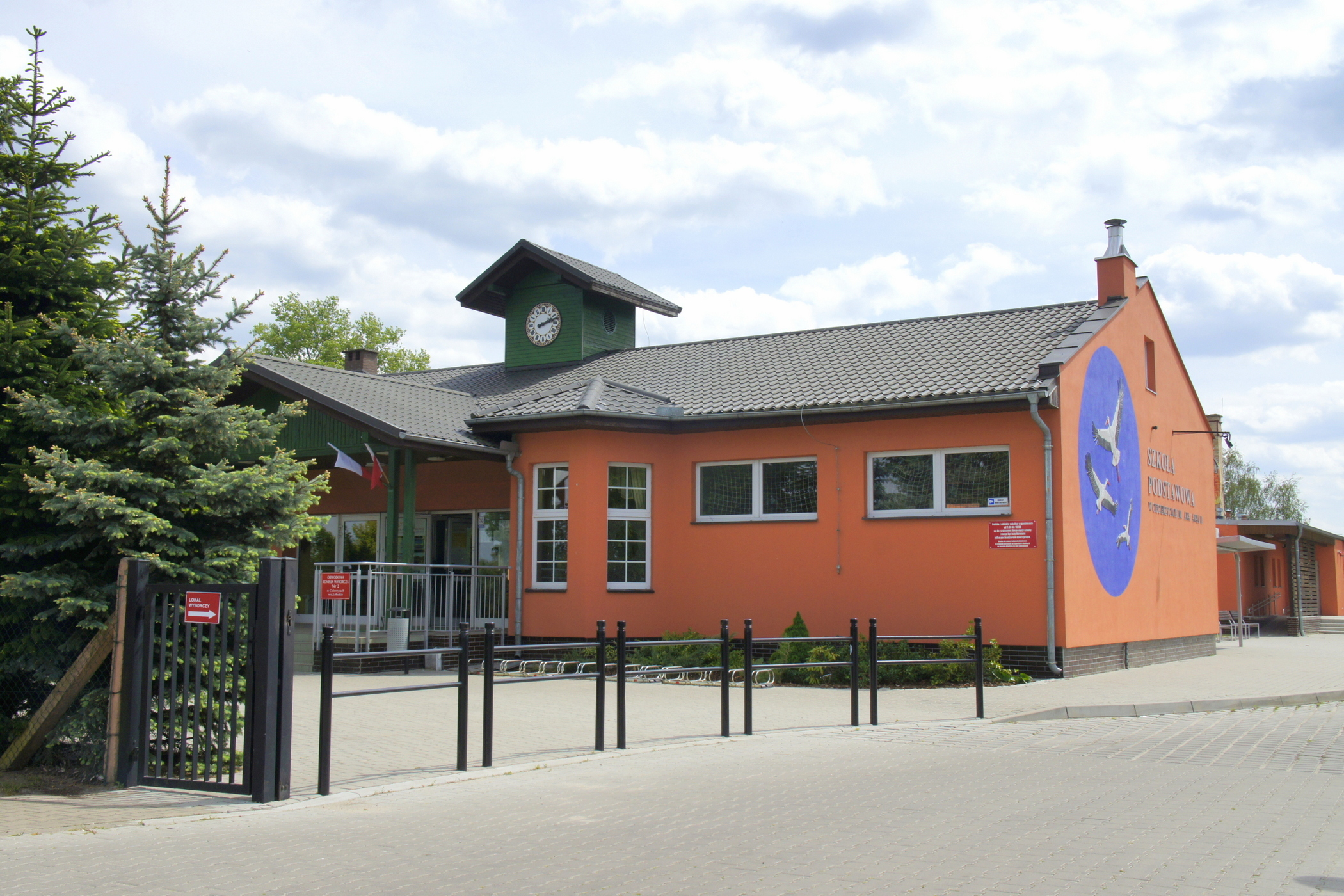
- John Paul II Primary School in Ciecierzyce

- Location within Poland
- Coordinates: 52°42′N 15°21′E
- Country: Poland
- Voivodeship: Lubusz
- County: Gorzów
- Gmina: Deszczno
- Population: 504
- Time zone: UTC+1 (CET)
  - Summer (DST): UTC+2 (CEST)
- Vehicle registration: FGW

Ciecierzyce [t͡ɕɛt͡ɕɛˈʐɨt͡sɛ] is a village in the administrative district of Gmina Deszczno, within Gorzów County, Lubusz Voivodeship, in western Poland.

== History ==
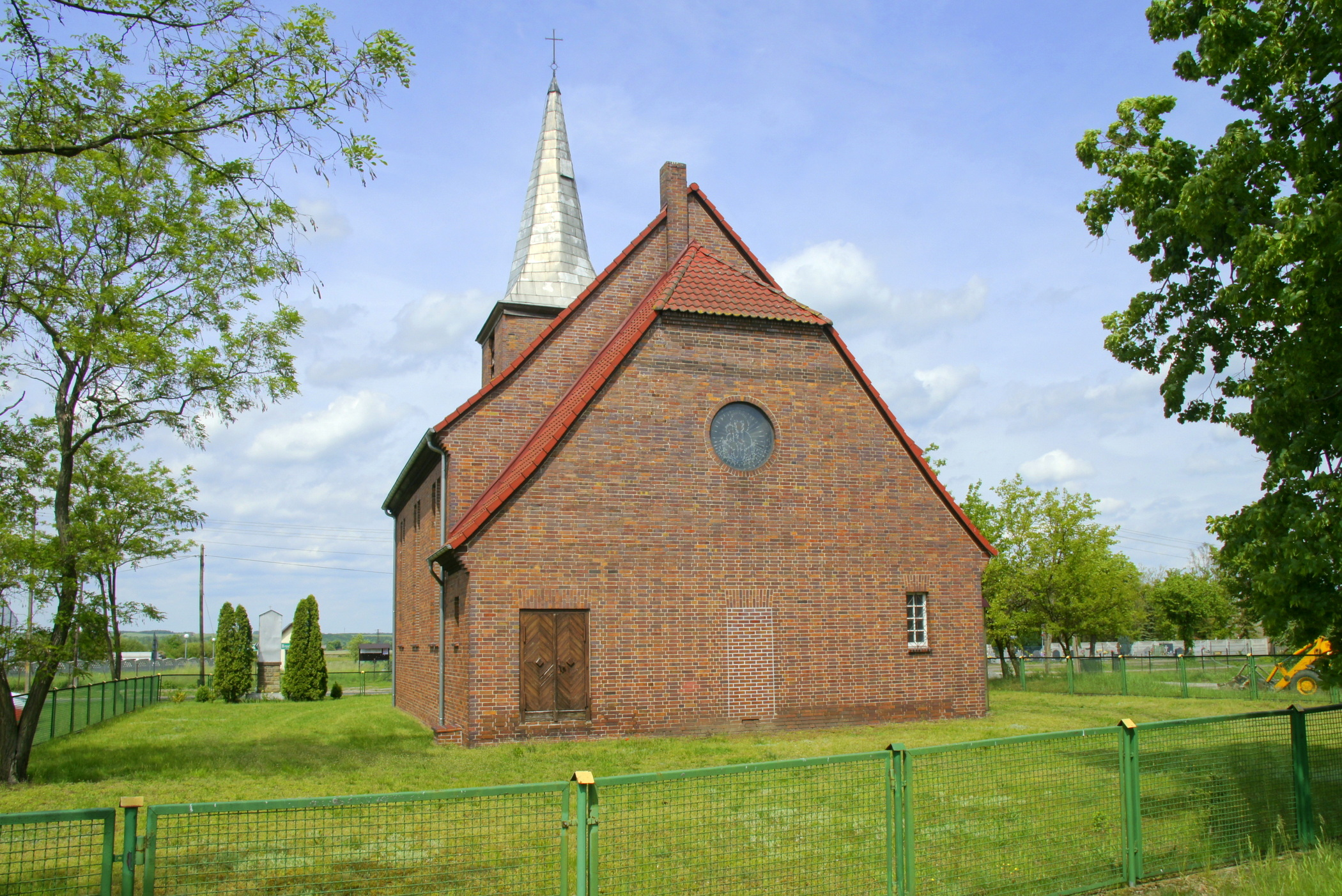
Our Lady of the Rosary church

The area became part of the emerging Polish state in the 10th century. Following Poland's fragmentation, it formed part of the Duchy of Greater Poland. Later on, the area passed to Brandenburg, Bohemia (Czechia), Prussia, and Germany. The village was founded in 1758, by order of the king to colonize the Warta valley. Initially, the name, Neu Borkow (Nowy Borek), referred to the nearby, old village of Borek. Then, to celebrate the commander of the dragon regiment of Gorzów, Lieutenant General Ernst Heinrich Freiherr von Czetteritz, the name was changed to Gross Czettritz. In 1767 the neighboring colony Klein Czettritz was founded. Both villages were united in 1929. Following Germany's defeat in World War II in 1945, the area became again part of Poland.
