= Jastrzębnik =

Jastrzębnik may refer to:

- Jastrzębnik, Lubusz Voivodeship, Poland
- Jastrzębnik, Masovian Voivodeship, Poland
