= Lipki Małe =

- Village
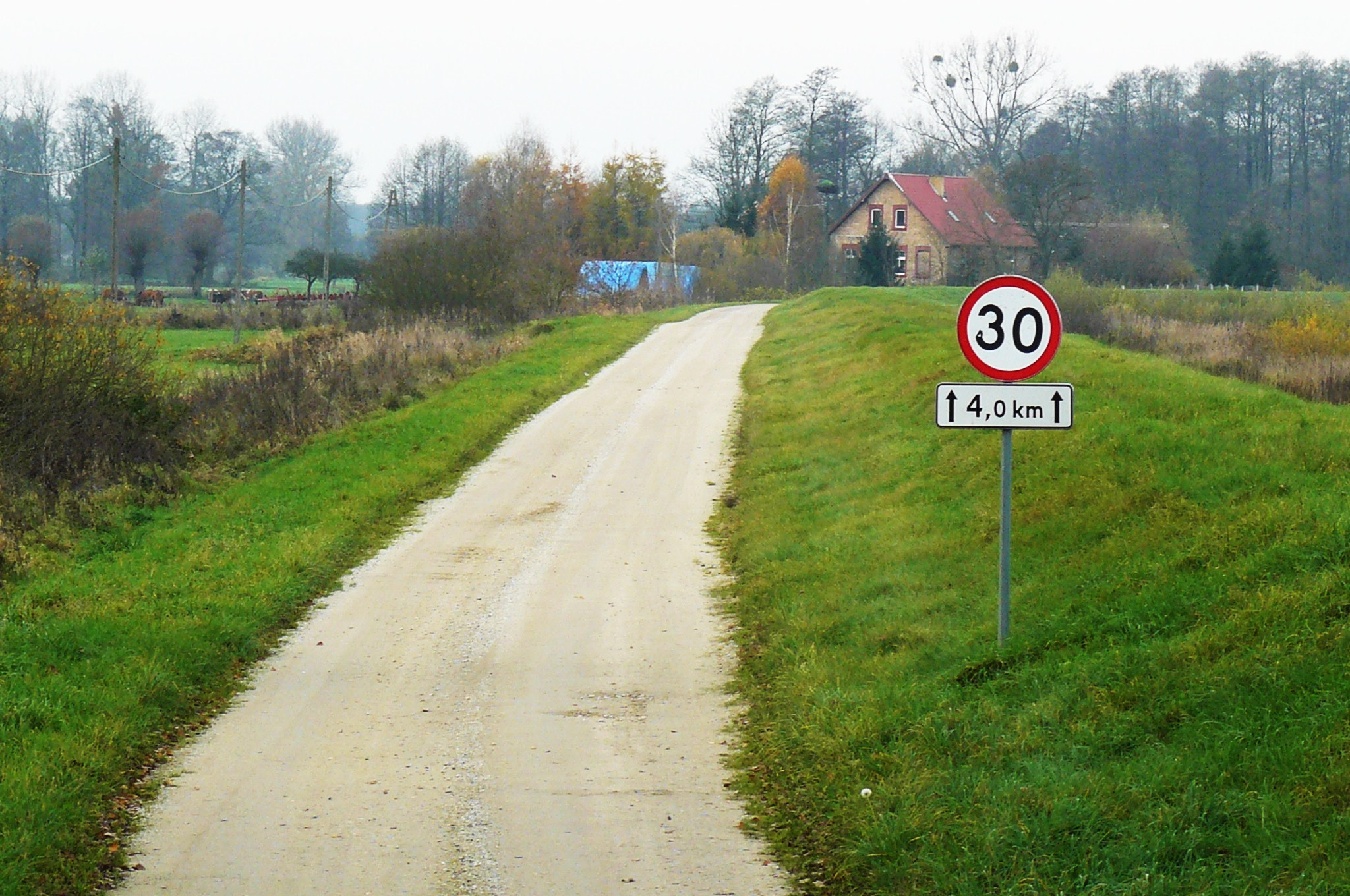
- Street of Lipki Małe

- Location within Poland
- Coordinates: 52°45′47″N 15°32′51″E
- Country: Poland
- Voivodeship: Lubusz
- County: Gorzów
- Gmina: Santok

Lipki Małe [ˈlipki ˈmawɛ] is a village in the administrative district of Gmina Santok, within Gorzów County, Lubusz Voivodeship, in western Poland.
