= Prądocin, Lubusz Voivodeship =

Prądocin
- Village
- Location within Poland
- Coordinates: 52°40′N 15°13′E
- Country: Poland
- Voivodeship: Lubusz
- County: Gorzów
- Gmina: Deszczno

Prądocin [prɔnˈdɔt͡ɕin] is a village in the administrative district of Gmina Deszczno, within Gorzów County, Lubusz Voivodeship, in western Poland.
