= Bolemin =

- Village
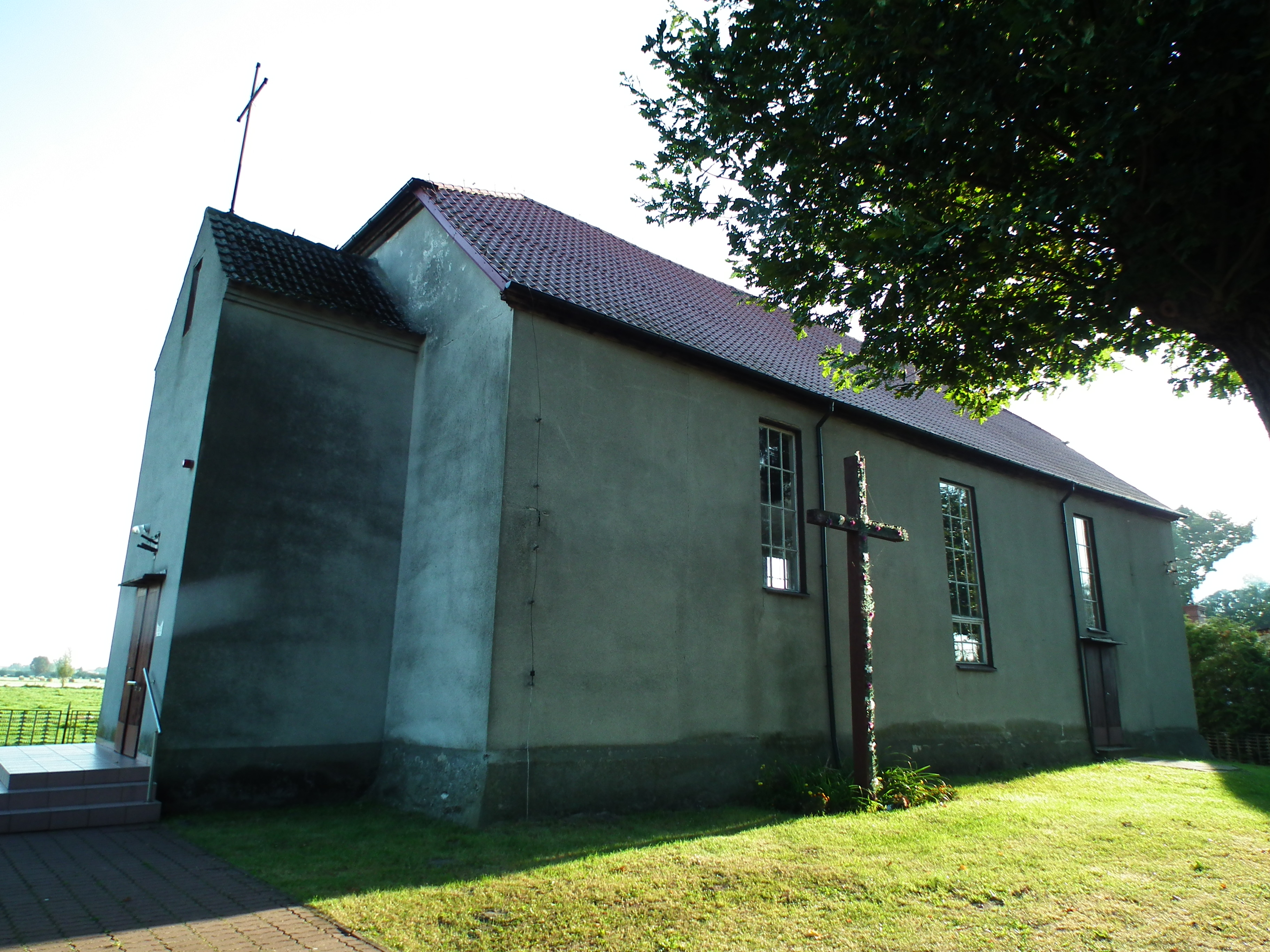
- Catholic church

- Location within Poland
- Coordinates: 52°38′N 15°14′E
- Country: Poland
- Voivodeship: Lubusz
- County: Gorzów
- Gmina: Deszczno

Bolemin [bɔˈlɛmin] is a village in the administrative district of Gmina Deszczno, within Gorzów County, Lubusz Voivodeship, in western Poland.
