= Ulim =

- Village
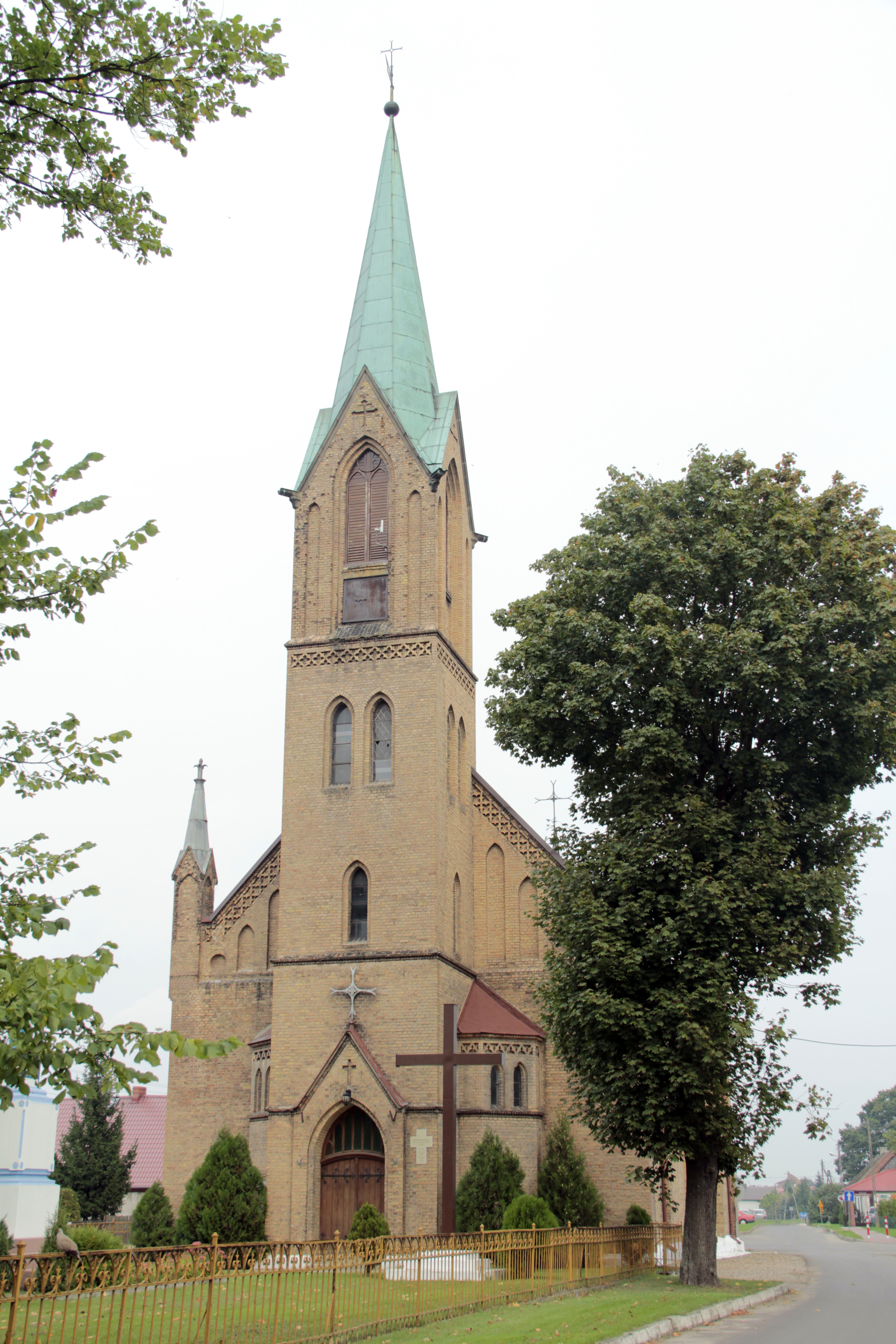
- Catholic church

- Location within Poland
- Coordinates: 52°41′N 15°13′E
- Country: Poland
- Voivodeship: Lubusz
- County: Gorzów
- Gmina: Deszczno

Ulim [ˈulim] is a village in the administrative district of Gmina Deszczno, within Gorzów County, Lubusz Voivodeship, in western Poland.
