= Baczyna, Lubusz Voivodeship =

Baczyna
- Village
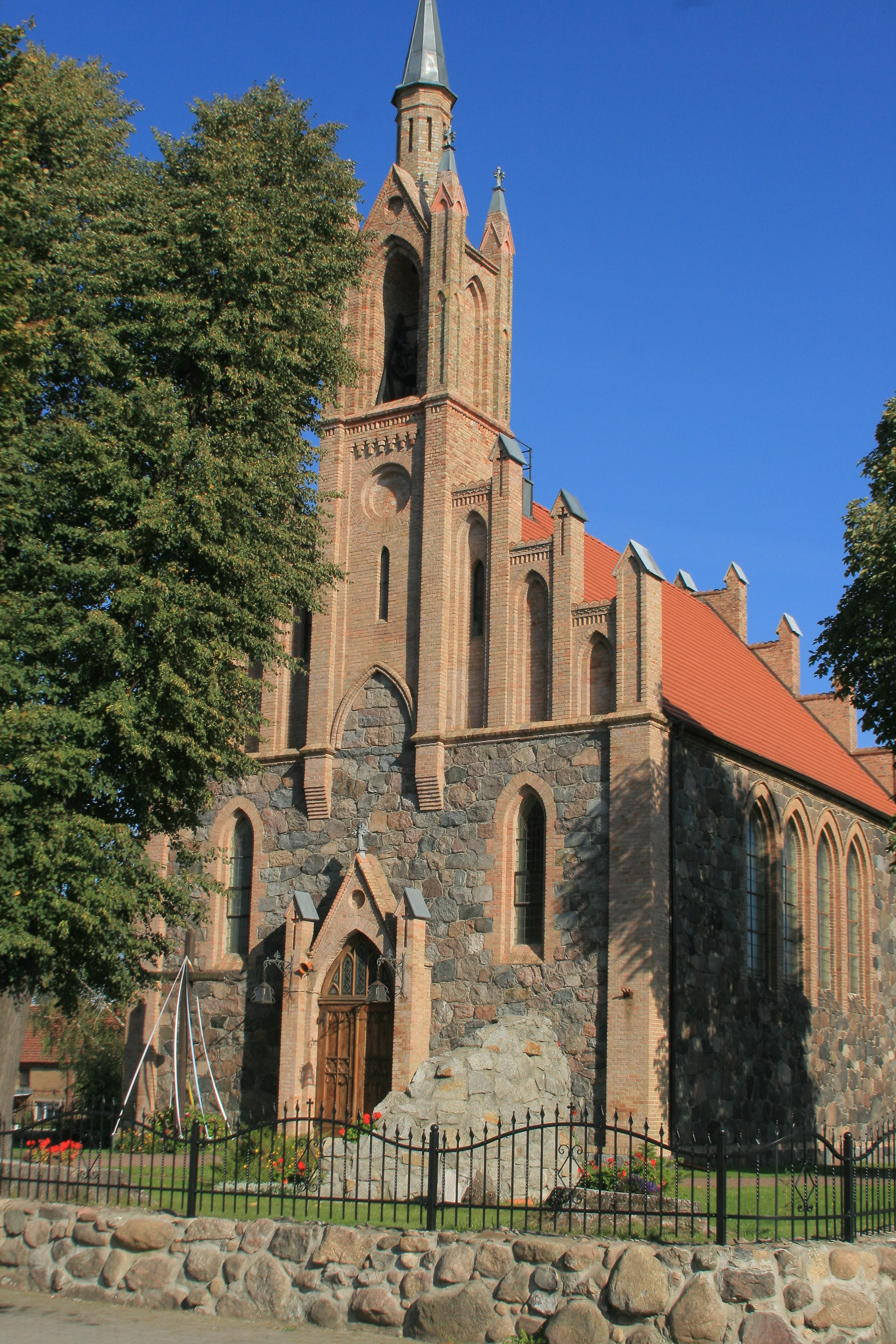
- Saints Peter and Paul church

- Location within Poland
- Coordinates: 52°45′N 15°6′E
- Country: Poland
- Voivodeship: Lubusz
- County: Gorzów
- Gmina: Lubiszyn
- Population: 900

Baczyna [baˈt͡ʂɨna] is a village in the administrative district of Gmina Lubiszyn, within Gorzów County, Lubusz Voivodeship, in western Poland.
