= Baranowice, Lubusz Voivodeship =

Baranowice
- Village
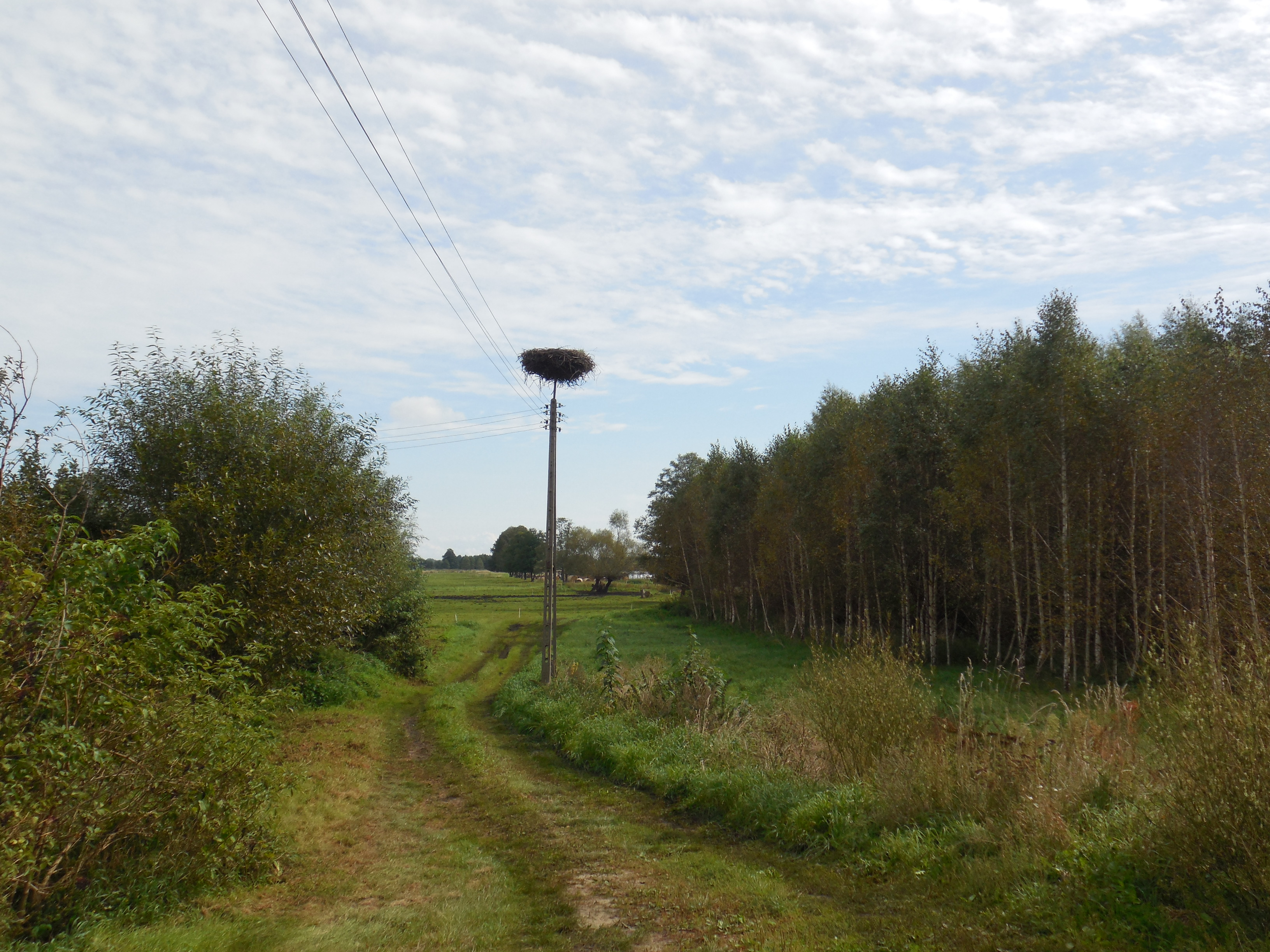

- Location within Poland
- Coordinates: 52°44′23″N 15°33′24″E
- Country: Poland
- Voivodeship: Lubusz
- County: Gorzów
- Gmina: Santok
- Population: 110

Baranowice [baranɔˈvit͡sɛ] is a village in the administrative district of Gmina Santok, within Gorzów County, Lubusz Voivodeship, in western Poland.
