= Glinik, Lubusz Voivodeship =

Glinik
- Village
- Location within Poland
- Coordinates: 52°38′N 15°18′E
- Country: Poland
- Voivodeship: Lubusz
- County: Gorzów
- Gmina: Deszczno

Population
  - Total: 500
- Time zone: UTC+1 (CET)
  - Summer (DST): UTC+2 (CEST)
- Vehicle registration: FGW

Glinik [ˈɡlinik] is a village in the administrative district of Gmina Deszczno, within Gorzów County, Lubusz Voivodeship, in western Poland.
