= Staw, Lubusz Voivodeship =

Staw
- Village
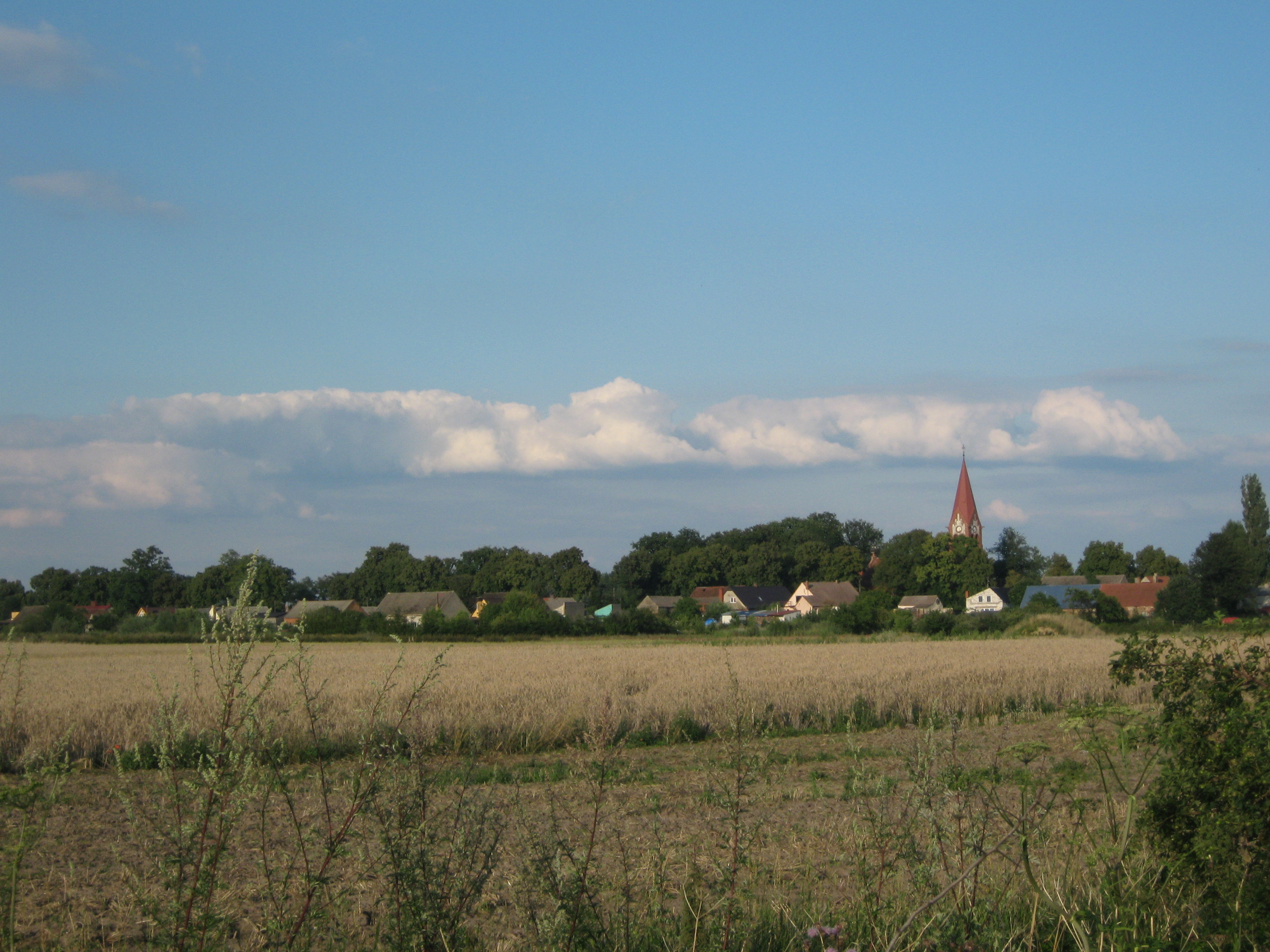
- View of Staw

- Location within Poland
- Coordinates: 52°51′49″N 14°55′49″E
- Country: Poland
- Voivodeship: Lubusz
- County: Gorzów
- Gmina: Lubiszyn

Staw [staf] is a village in the administrative district of Gmina Lubiszyn, within Gorzów County, Lubusz Voivodeship, in western Poland.
