= Dzikowo, Gorzów County =

Dzikowo
- Village
- Location within Poland
- Coordinates: 52°50′N 15°1′E
- Country: Poland
- Voivodeship: Lubusz
- County: Gorzów
- Gmina: Lubiszyn

Dzikowo [d͡ʑiˈkɔvɔ] is a village in the administrative district of Gmina Lubiszyn, within Gorzów County, Lubusz Voivodeship, in western Poland.
