= Płonica =

Płonica may refer to the following places in Poland:

- Płonica, Lower Silesian Voivodeship (south-west Poland)
- Płonica, Lubusz Voivodeship (west Poland)
- Płonica, Pomeranian Voivodeship (north Poland)
