= Jastrzębiec, Lubusz Voivodeship =

Jastrzębiec
- Village
- Location within Poland
- Coordinates: 52°50′30″N 15°3′4″E
- Country: Poland
- Voivodeship: Lubusz
- County: Gorzów
- Gmina: Lubiszyn
- Population: 60

Jastrzębiec [jasˈtʂɛmbjɛt͡s] is a village in the administrative district of Gmina Lubiszyn, within Gorzów County, Lubusz Voivodeship, in western Poland.
