= Gralewo, Lubusz Voivodeship =

Gralewo
- Village
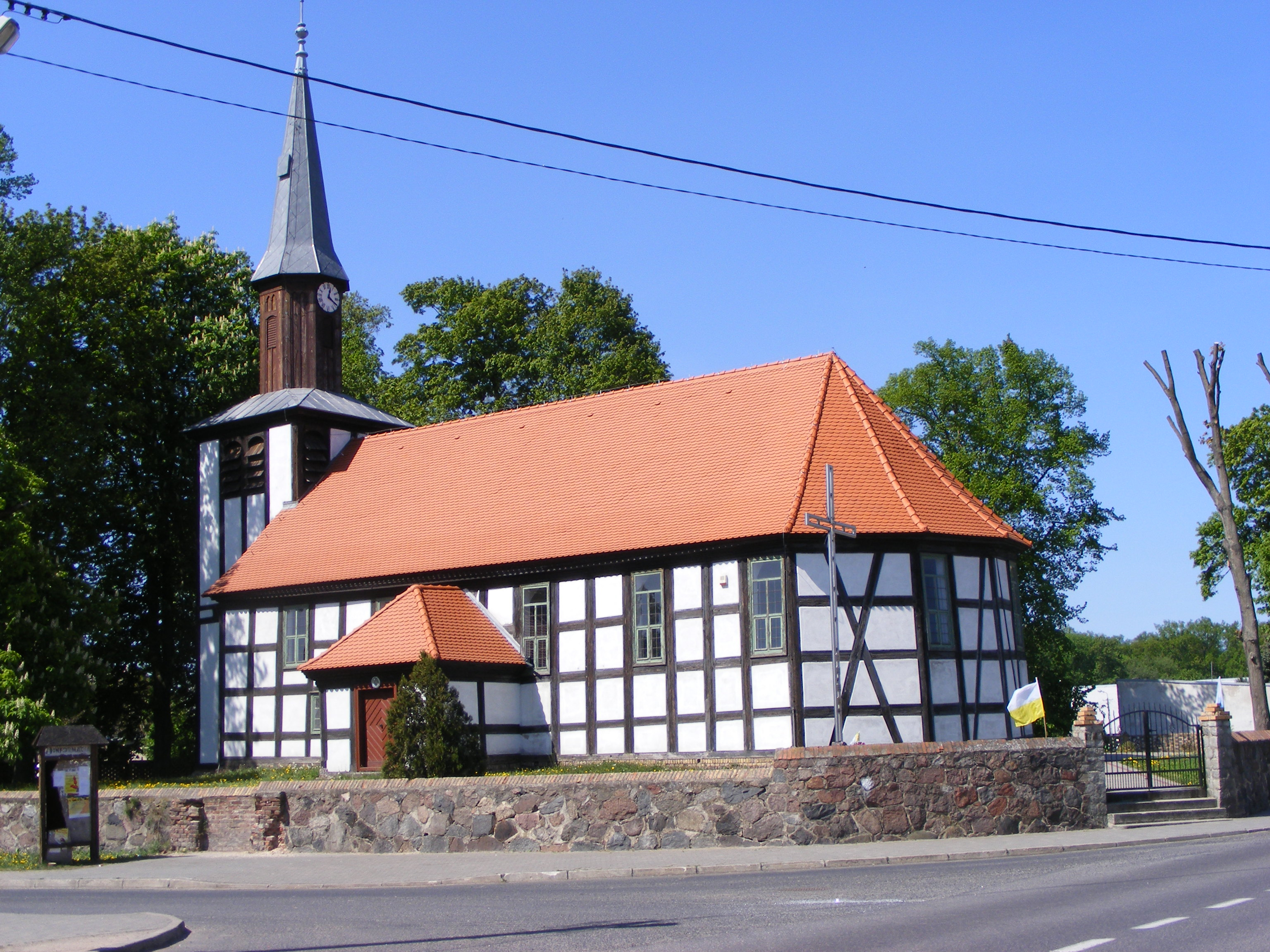

- Location within Poland
- Coordinates: 52°45′N 15°23′E
- Country: Poland
- Voivodeship: Lubusz
- County: Gorzów
- Gmina: Santok
- Population: 820

Gralewo [ɡraˈlɛvɔ] is a village in the administrative district of Gmina Santok, within Gorzów County, Lubusz Voivodeship, in western Poland.
