= Podlesie, Lubusz Voivodeship =

Podlesie
- Village
- Location within Poland
- Coordinates: 52°51′13″N 14°56′14″E
- Country: Poland
- Voivodeship: Lubusz
- County: Gorzów
- Gmina: Lubiszyn
- Population: 70

Podlesie [pɔdˈlɛɕɛ] is a village in the administrative district of Gmina Lubiszyn, within Gorzów County, Lubusz Voivodeship, in western Poland.
