= Marwice, Lubusz Voivodeship =

Marwice
- Village
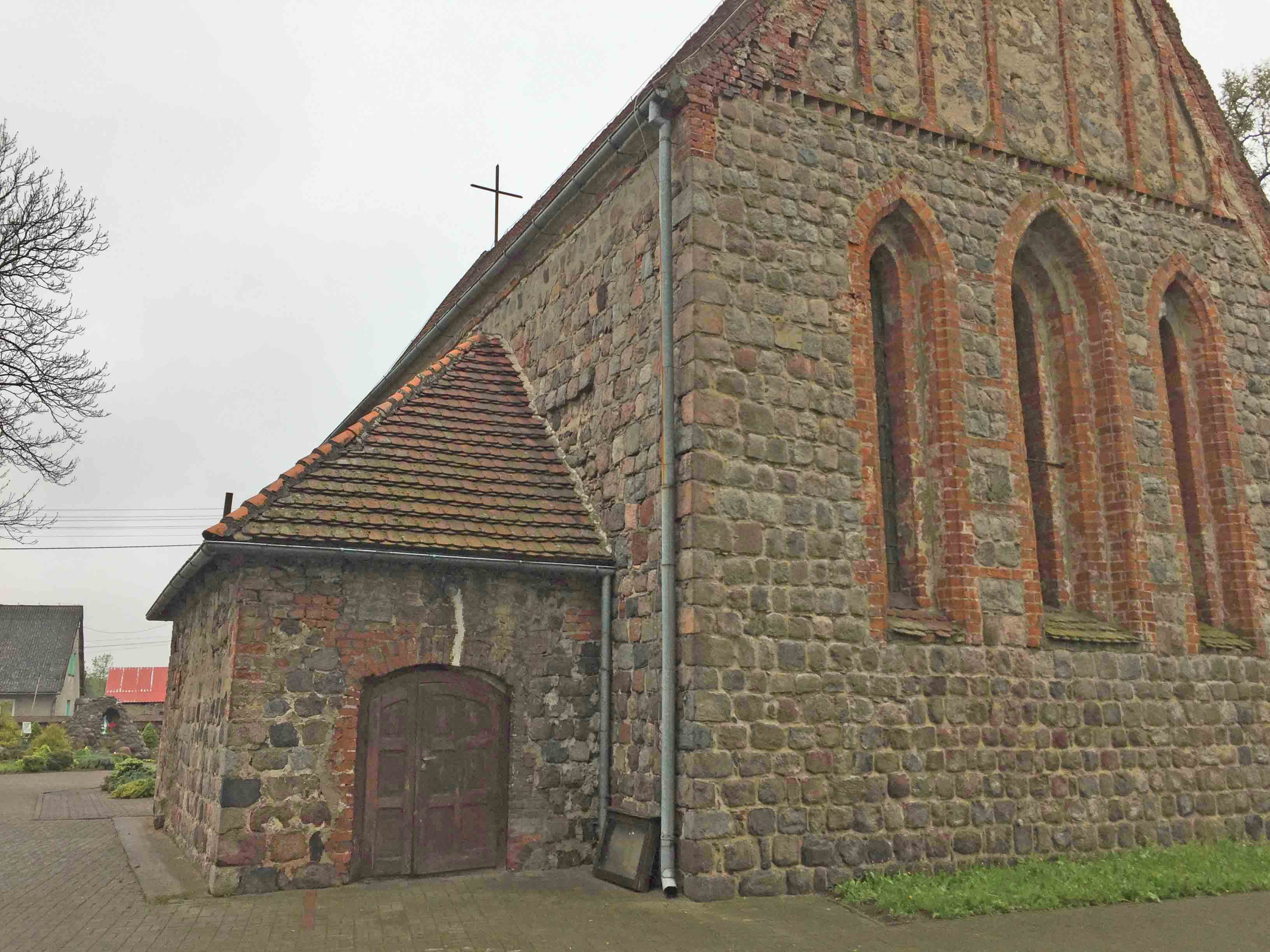
- Church of the Nativity

- Location within Poland
- Coordinates: 52°46′26″N 15°6′42″E
- Country: Poland
- Voivodeship: Lubusz
- County: Gorzów
- Gmina: Lubiszyn
- Population: 600

Marwice [marˈvit͡sɛ] is a village in the administrative district of Gmina Lubiszyn, within Gorzów County, Lubusz Voivodeship, in western Poland.
