= Stare Polichno =

- Village
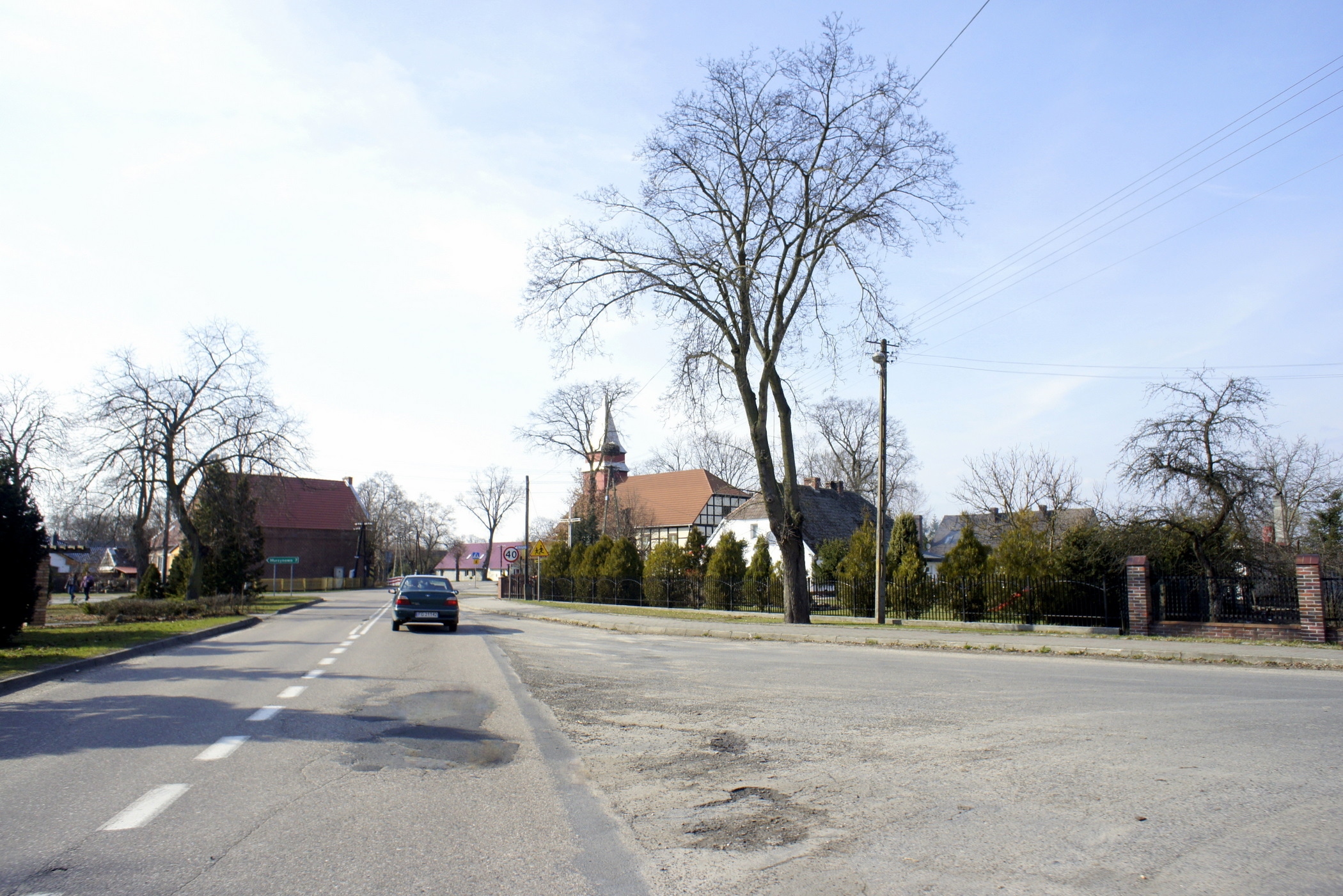

- Location within Poland
- Coordinates: 52°43′N 15°25′E
- Country: Poland
- Voivodeship: Lubusz
- County: Gorzów
- Gmina: Santok
- Population: 713

Stare Polichno [ˈstarɛ pɔˈlixnɔ] is a village in the administrative district of Gmina Santok, within Gorzów County, Lubusz Voivodeship, in western Poland.
