= Lubno, Lubusz Voivodeship =

Lubno
- Village
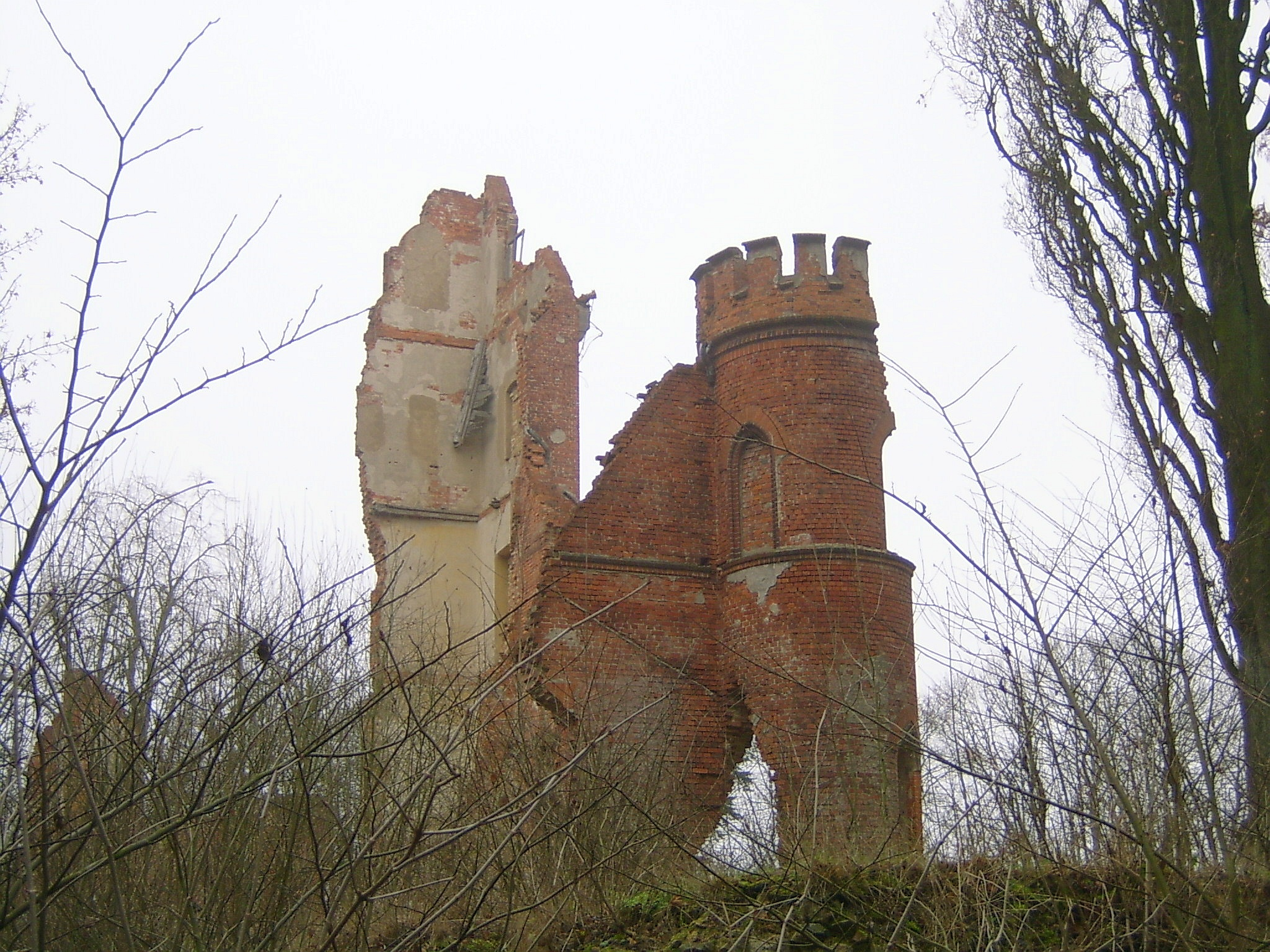
- Ruins of a palace in Lubno

- Location within Poland
- Coordinates: 52°44′N 15°1′E
- Country: Poland
- Voivodeship: Lubusz
- County: Gorzów
- Gmina: Lubiszyn
- Population: 740

Lubno [ˈlubnɔ] (German Liebenow) is a village in the administrative district of Gmina Lubiszyn, within Gorzów County, Lubusz Voivodeship, in western Poland.
