= Mąkoszyce =

Mąkoszyce may refer to the following places:

- Mąkoszyce, Greater Poland Voivodeship (west-central Poland)
- Mąkoszyce, Lubusz Voivodeship (west Poland)
- Mąkoszyce, Opole Voivodeship (south-west Poland)
