= Niwica, Gorzów County =

Niwica
- Village
- Location within Poland
- Coordinates: 52°41′N 15°11′E
- Country: Poland
- Voivodeship: Lubusz
- County: Gorzów
- Gmina: Deszczno
- Postal code: 66-446

Niwica [niˈvit͡sa] is a village in the administrative district of Gmina Deszczno, within Gorzów County, Lubusz Voivodeship, in western Poland.
