= Osiedle Poznańskie =

- Village
- Location within Poland
- Coordinates: 52°42′0″N 15°20′0″E
- Country: Poland
- Voivodeship: Lubusz
- County: Gorzów
- Gmina: Deszczno

Osiedle Poznańskie (Polish pronunciation: [ɔˈɕɛdlɛ pɔzˈnaj̃skʲɛ]) is a village in the administrative district of Gmina Deszczno, within Gorzów County, Lubusz Voivodeship, in western Poland.
