= Łąkomin =

- Village
- Location within Poland
- Coordinates: 52°45′N 14°51′E
- Country: Poland
- Voivodeship: Lubusz
- County: Gorzów
- Gmina: Lubiszyn

Łąkomin [wɔnˈkɔmin] is a village in the administrative district of Gmina Lubiszyn, within Gorzów County, Lubusz Voivodeship, in western Poland.
