= Kozin, Lubusz Voivodeship =

Kozin
- Village
- Location within Poland
- Coordinates: 52°51′N 14°57′E
- Country: Poland
- Voivodeship: Lubusz
- County: Gorzów
- Gmina: Lubiszyn

Kozin [ˈkɔʑin] is a village in the administrative district of Gmina Lubiszyn, within Gorzów County, Lubusz Voivodeship, in western Poland.
