= Dzierżów =

- Village
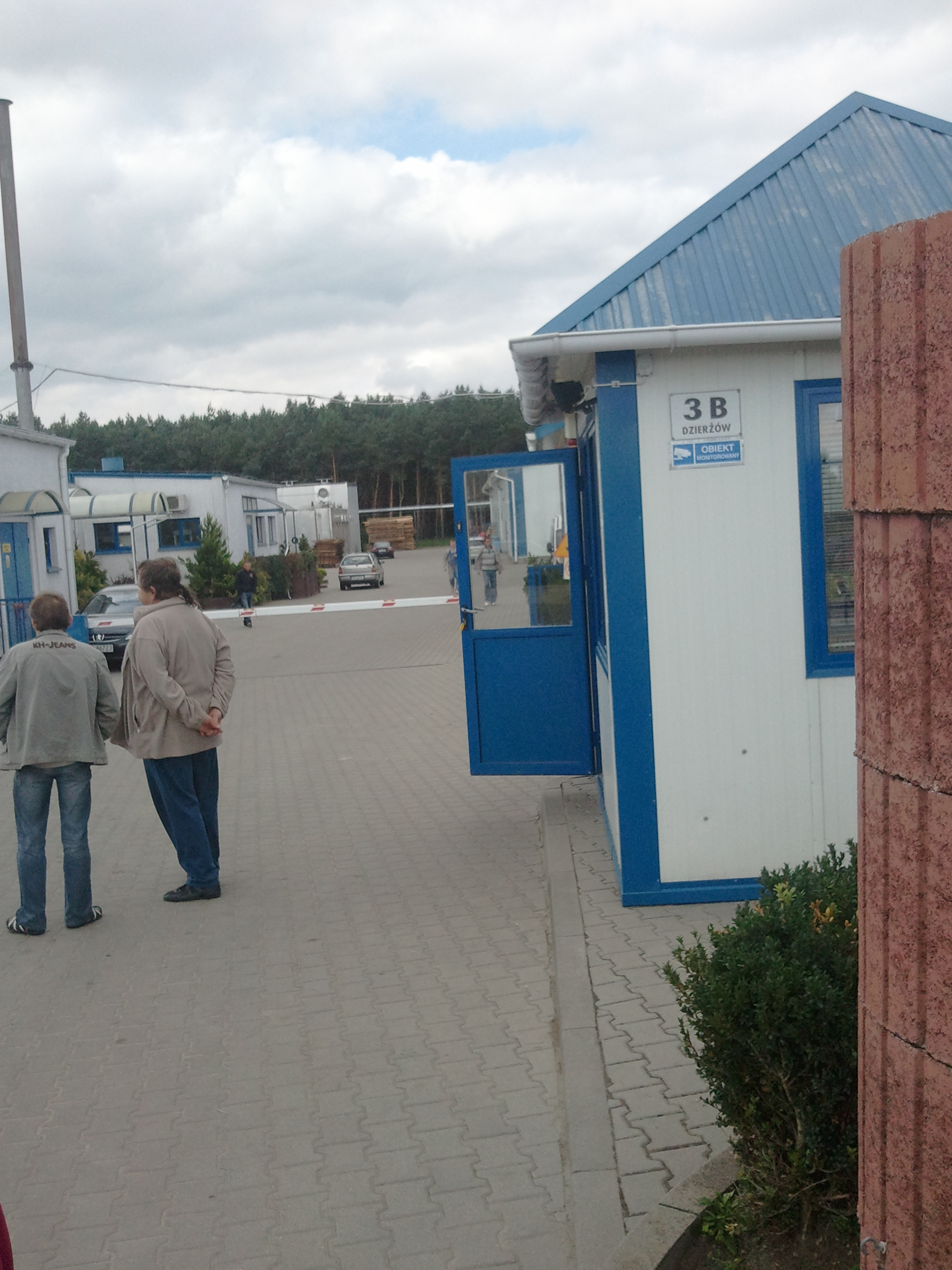

- Location within Poland
- Coordinates: 52°40′N 15°12′E
- Country: Poland
- Voivodeship: Lubusz
- County: Gorzów
- Gmina: Deszczno

Dzierżów [ˈd͡ʑɛrʐuf] is a village in the administrative district of Gmina Deszczno, within Gorzów County, Lubusz Voivodeship, in western Poland.
