= Górki, Gorzów County =

Górki
- Village
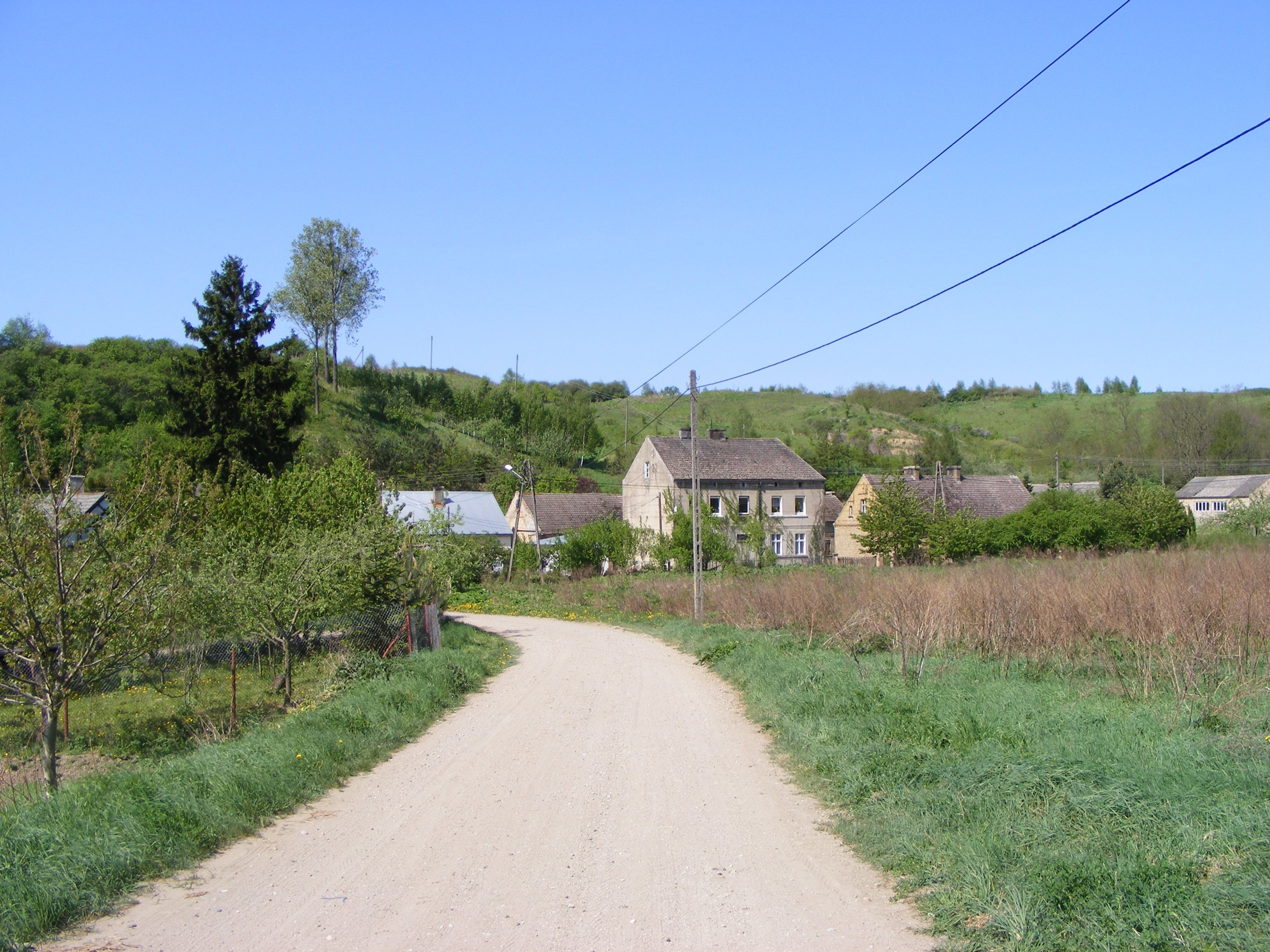

- Location within Poland
- Coordinates: 52°44′N 15°21′E
- Country: Poland
- Voivodeship: Lubusz
- County: Gorzów
- Gmina: Santok
- Population: 120

Górki [ˈɡurki] is a village in the administrative district of Gmina Santok, within Gorzów County, Lubusz Voivodeship, in western Poland.
