= Janczewo, Lubusz Voivodeship =

Janczewo
- Village
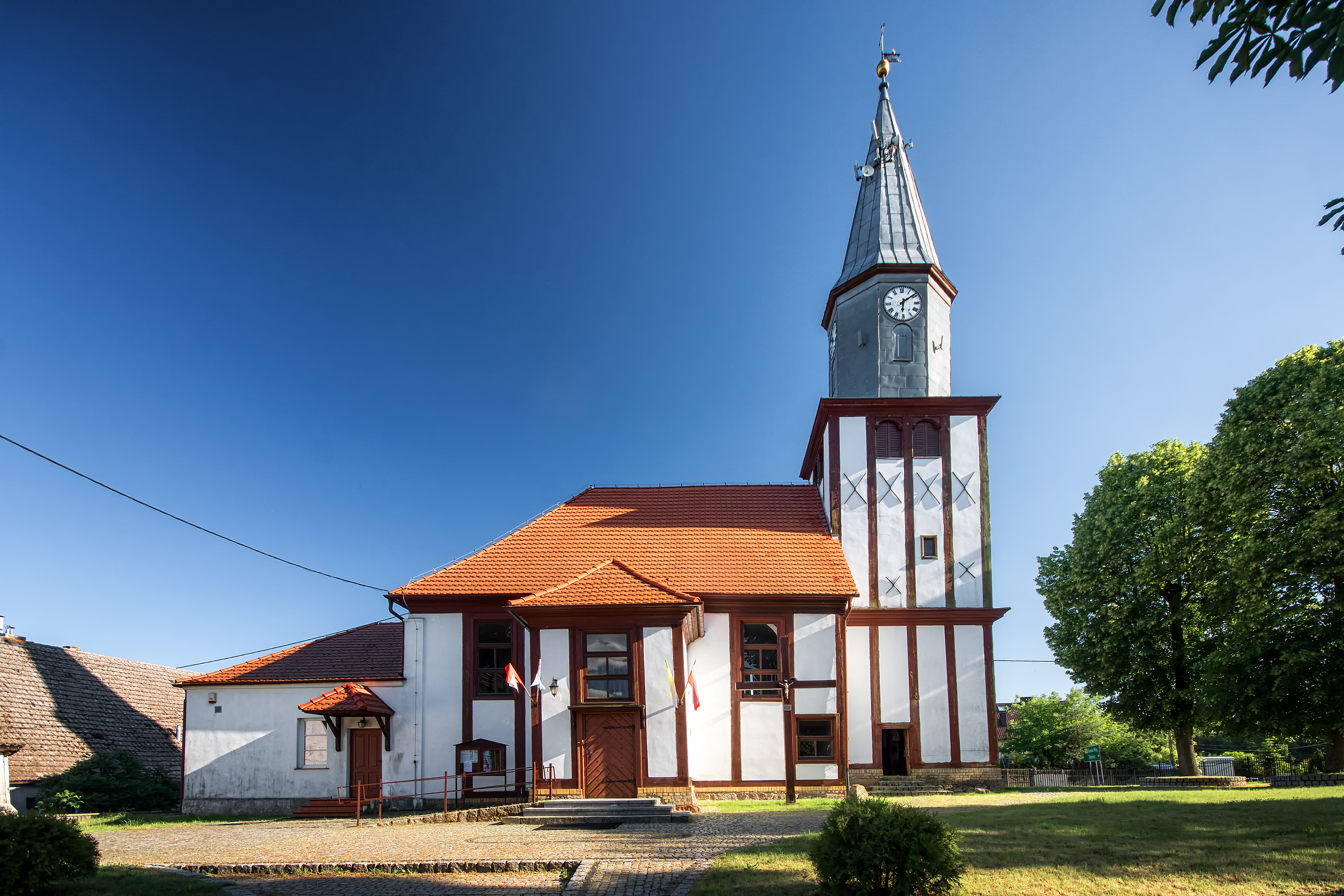
- Catholic church

- Location within Poland
- Coordinates: 52°45′N 15°20′E
- Country: Poland
- Voivodeship: Lubusz
- County: Gorzów
- Gmina: Santok
- Population: 730

Janczewo [janˈt͡ʂɛvɔ] is a village in the administrative district of Gmina Santok, within Gorzów County, Lubusz Voivodeship, in western Poland.
