= Zacisze, Gorzów County =

Zacisze
- Village
- Location within Poland
- Coordinates: 52°51′21″N 14°54′11″E
- Country: Poland
- Voivodeship: Lubusz
- County: Gorzów
- Gmina: Lubiszyn

Zacisze [zaˈt͡ɕiʂɛ] is a village in the administrative district of Gmina Lubiszyn, within Gorzów County, Lubusz Voivodeship, in western Poland.
