= Lipki Wielkie =

- Village
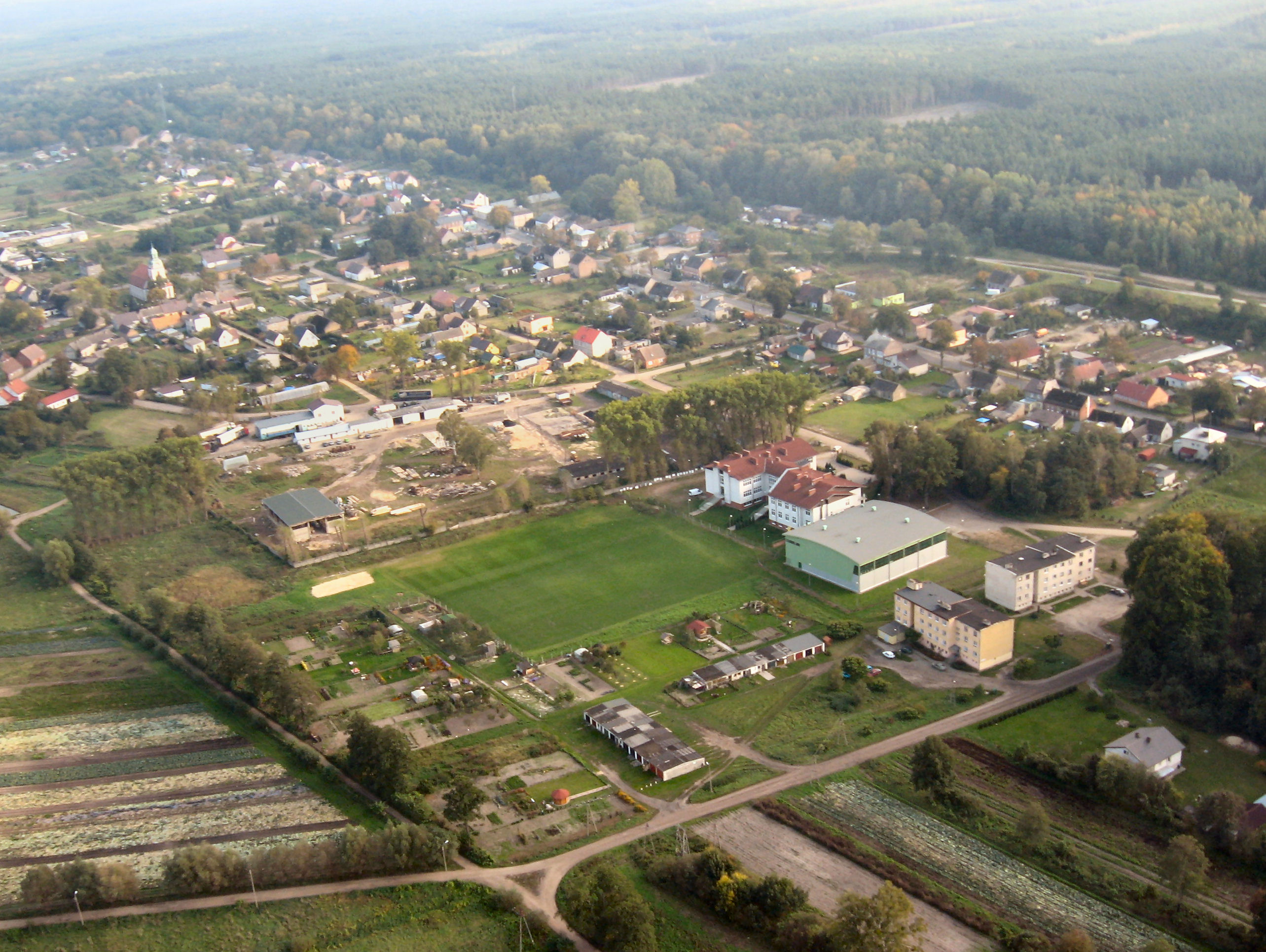

- Location within Poland
- Coordinates: 52°43′N 15°31′E
- Country: Poland
- Voivodeship: Lubusz
- County: Gorzów
- Gmina: Santok
- Population: 1,200

Lipki Wielkie [ˈlipki ˈvjɛlkʲɛ] is a village in the administrative district of Gmina Santok, within Gorzów County, Lubusz Voivodeship, in western Poland.
