= Koszęcin, Lubusz Voivodeship =

Koszęcin
- Village
- Location within Poland
- Coordinates: 52°39′N 15°11′E
- Country: Poland
- Voivodeship: Lubusz
- County: Gorzów
- Gmina: Deszczno

Koszęcin [kɔˈʂɛnt͡ɕin] is a village in the administrative district of Gmina Deszczno, within Gorzów County, Lubusz Voivodeship, in western Poland.
