= Kiełpin, Gorzów County =

Kiełpin
- Village
- Location within Poland
- Coordinates: 52°37′N 15°13′E
- Country: Poland
- Voivodeship: Lubusz
- County: Gorzów
- Gmina: Deszczno
- Population: 80

Kiełpin [ˈkʲɛu̯pin] is a village in the administrative district of Gmina Deszczno, within Gorzów County, Lubusz Voivodeship, in western Poland.
