= Białobłocie =

Białobłocie refers to the following places in Poland:

- Białobłocie, Greater Poland Voivodeship
- Białobłocie, Lubusz Voivodeship
