= Tarnów, Gorzów County =

Tarnów
- Village
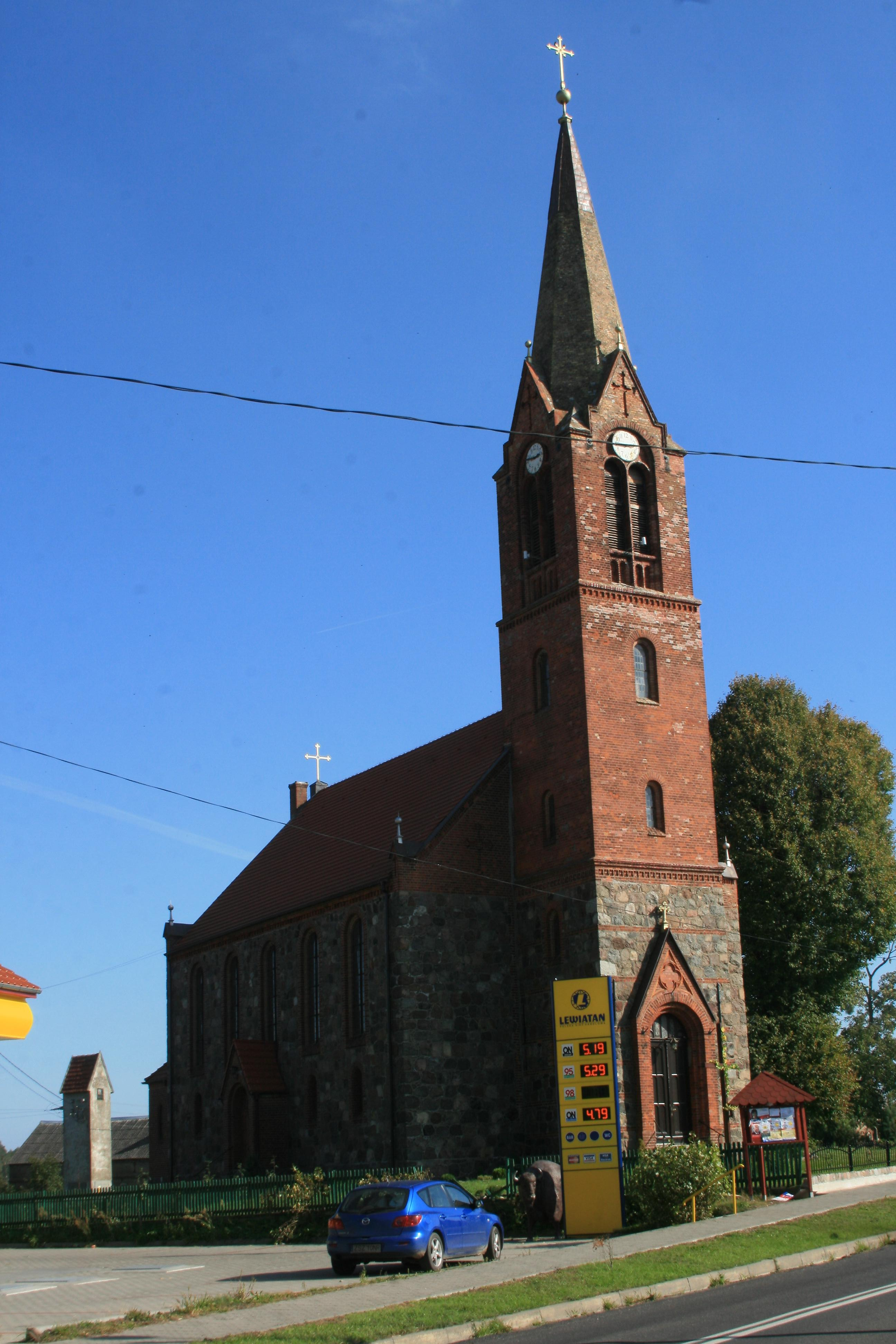
- Adalbert of Prague church

- Location within Poland
- Coordinates: 52°45′39″N 14°57′20″E
- Country: Poland
- Voivodeship: Lubusz
- County: Gorzów
- Gmina: Lubiszyn
- Population: 400

Tarnów [ˈtarnuf] is a village in the administrative district of Gmina Lubiszyn, within Gorzów County, Lubusz Voivodeship, in western Poland.
