= Wysoka, Gorzów County =

Wysoka
- Village
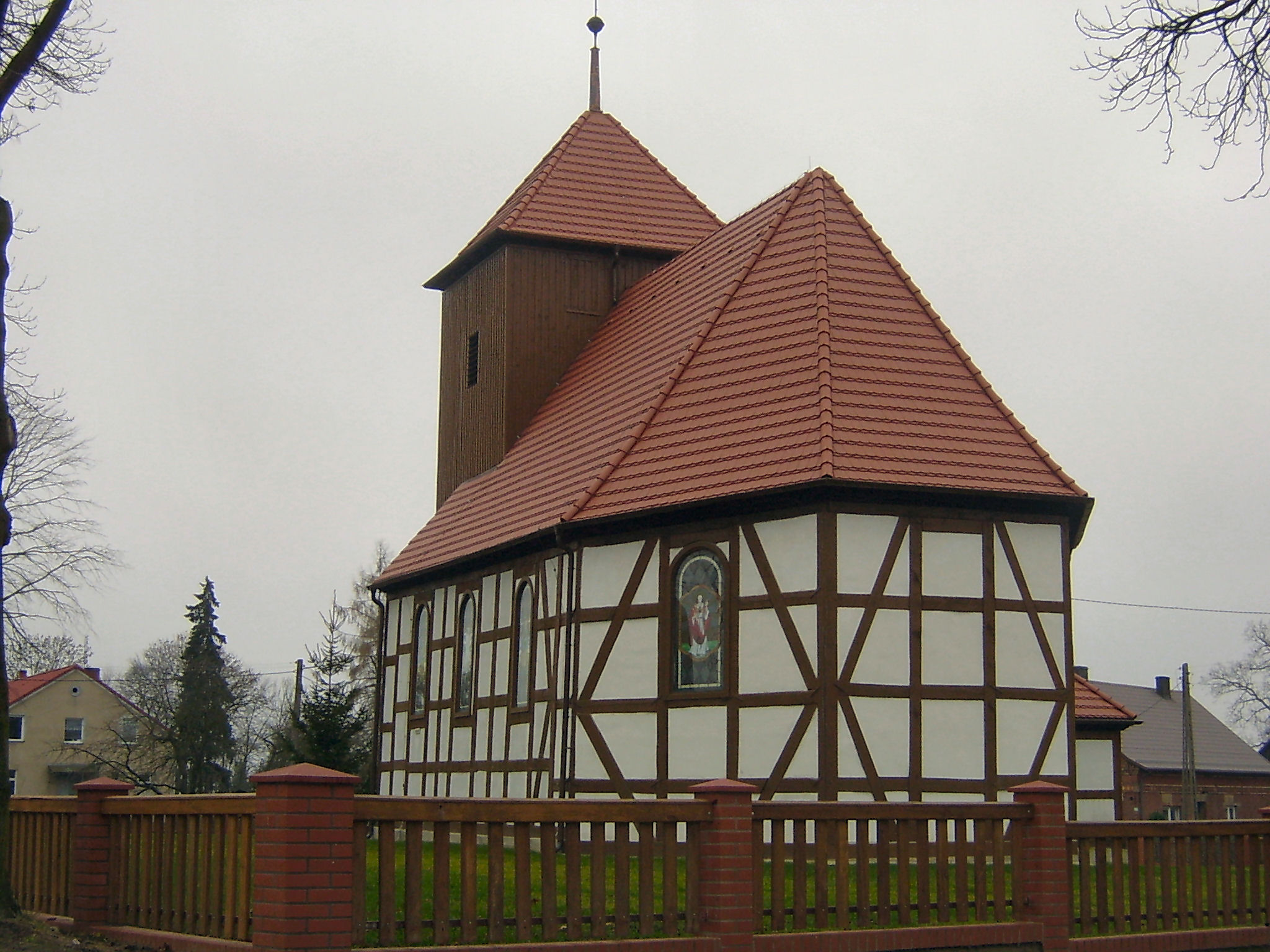
- Saint Nicholas Church

- Location within Poland
- Coordinates: 52°46′N 15°2′E
- Country: Poland
- Voivodeship: Lubusz
- County: Gorzów
- Gmina: Lubiszyn

Wysoka [vɨˈsɔka] is a village in the administrative district of Gmina Lubiszyn, within Gorzów County, Lubusz Voivodeship, in western Poland.
