= Nowe Polichno =

- Village
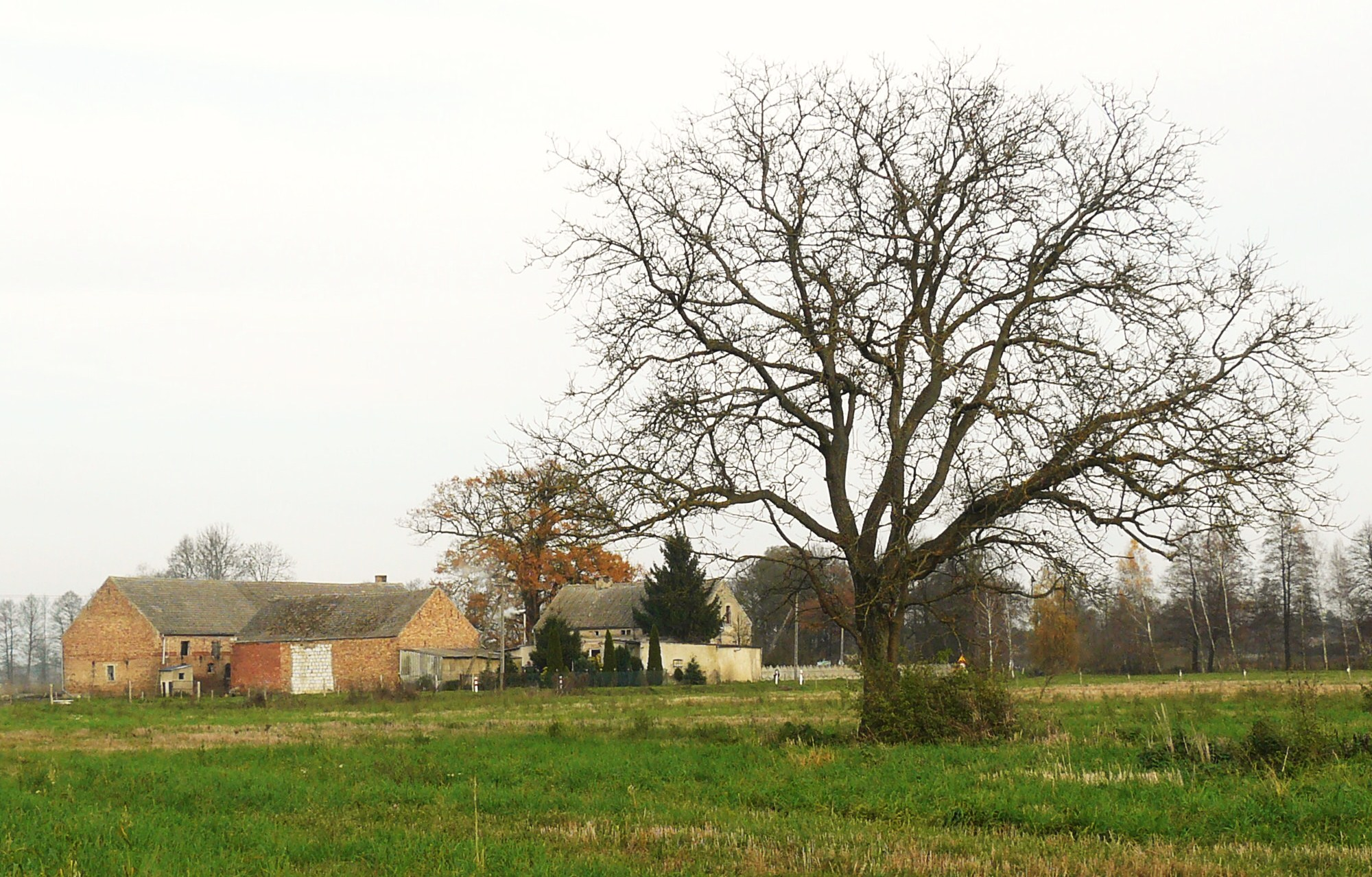

- Location within Poland
- Coordinates: 52°43′N 15°28′E
- Country: Poland
- Voivodeship: Lubusz
- County: Gorzów
- Gmina: Santok

Nowe Polichno [ˈnɔvɛ pɔˈlixnɔ] is a village in the administrative district of Gmina Santok, within Gorzów County, Lubusz Voivodeship, in western Poland.
