= Maszewo (disambiguation) =

Maszewo is a town in West Pomeranian Voivodeship (north-west Poland).

Maszewo may also refer to:

- Maszewo, Gorzów County in Lubusz Voivodeship (west Poland)
- Maszewo, Gmina Maszewo, Krosno County in Lubusz Voivodeship (west Poland)
- Maszewo, Masovian Voivodeship (east-central Poland)
