= Wawrów =

- Village
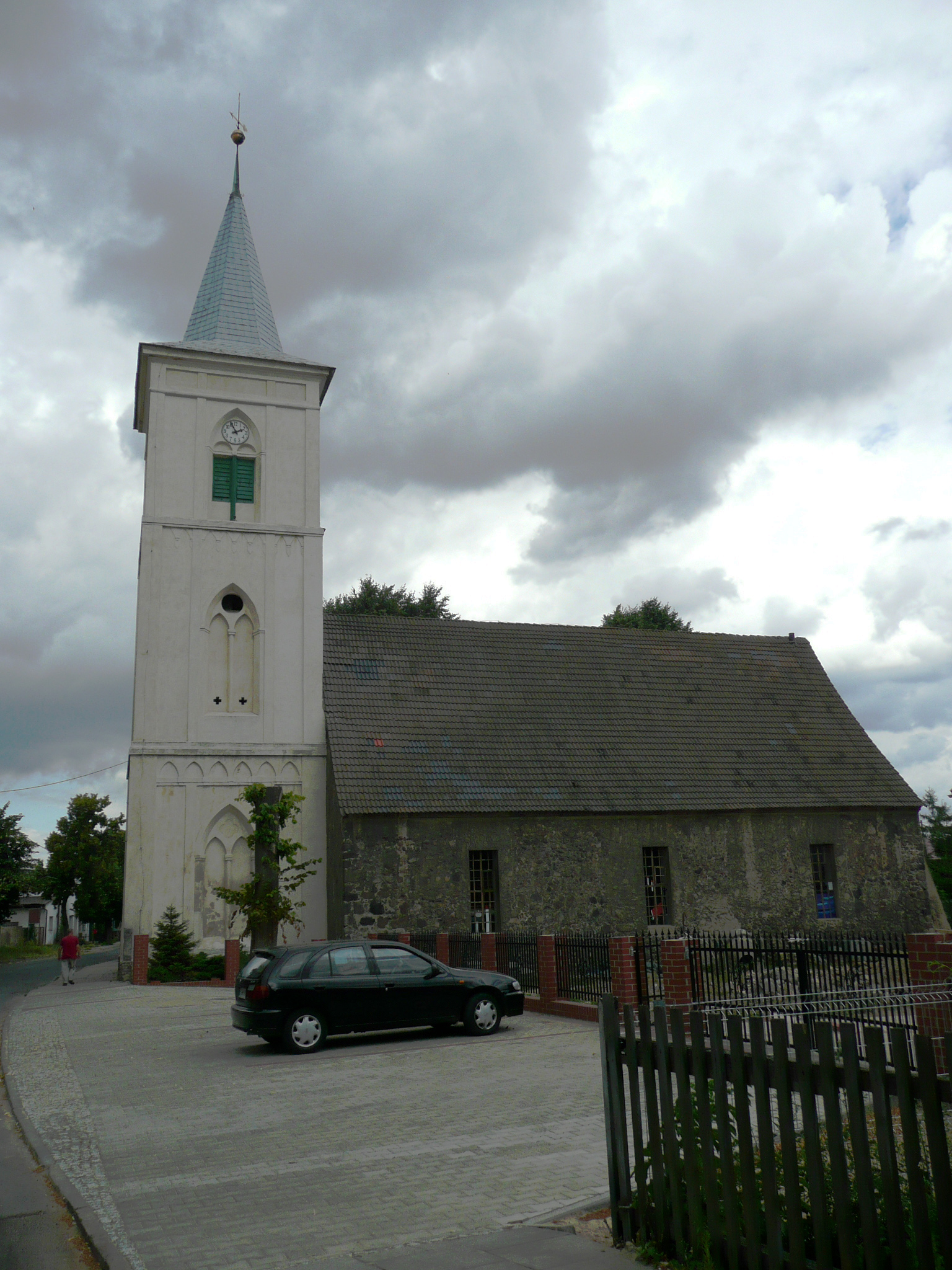
- Church

- Location within Poland
- Coordinates: 52°45′N 15°17′E
- Country: Poland
- Voivodeship: Lubusz
- County: Gorzów
- Gmina: Santok
- Population: 1,200

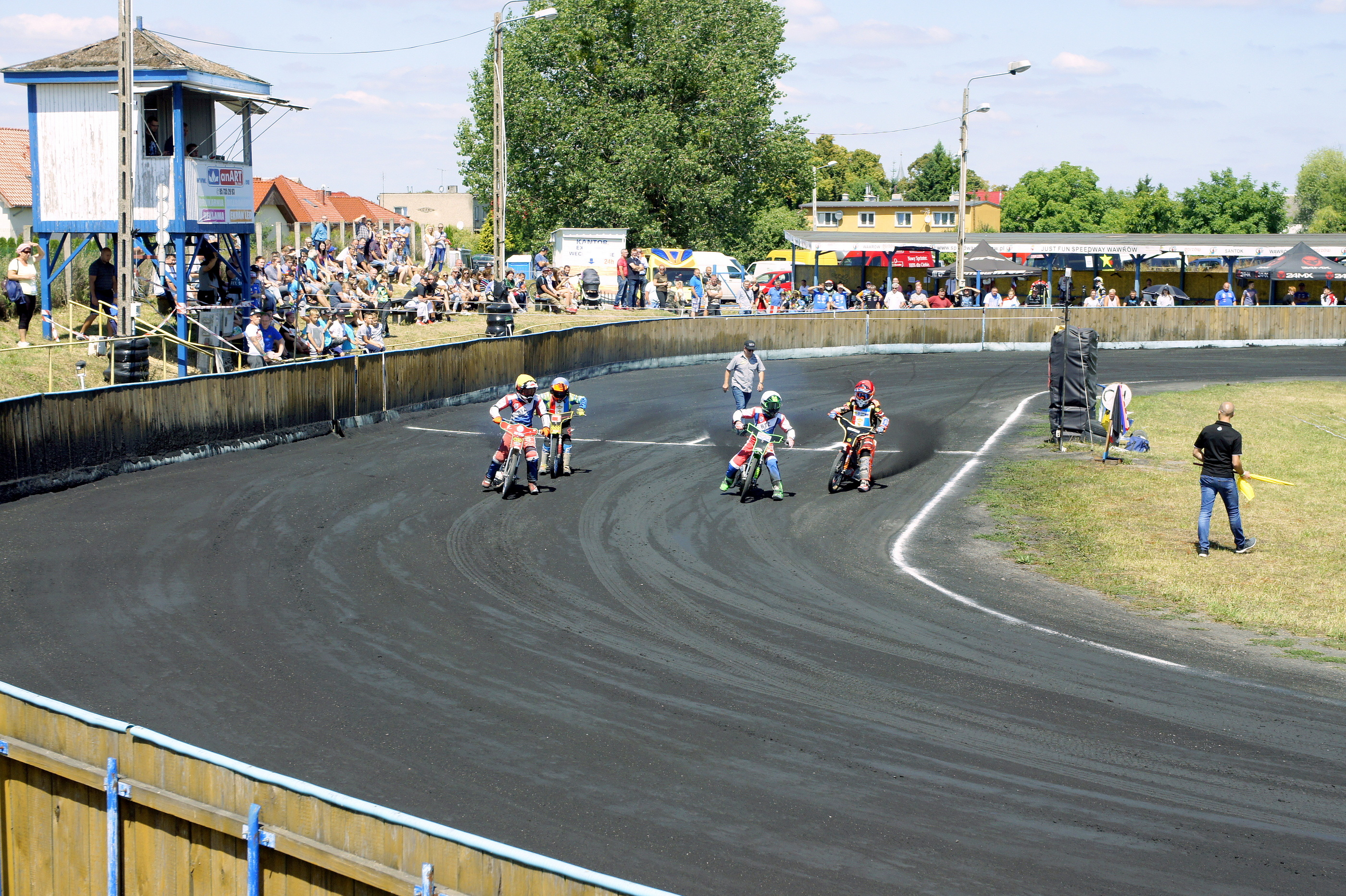
Speedway stadium

Wawrów [ˈvavruf] is a village in the administrative district of Gmina Santok, within Gorzów County, Lubusz Voivodeship, in western Poland.
