= Karnin, Poland =

Karnin
- Village
- Location within Poland
- Coordinates: 52°41′N 15°16′E
- Country: Poland
- Voivodeship: Lubusz
- County: Gorzów
- Gmina: Deszczno
- Population: 280

Karnin [ˈkarnin] is a village in the administrative district of Gmina Deszczno, within Gorzów County, Lubusz Voivodeship, in western Poland.
