= Ludzisławice =

- Village
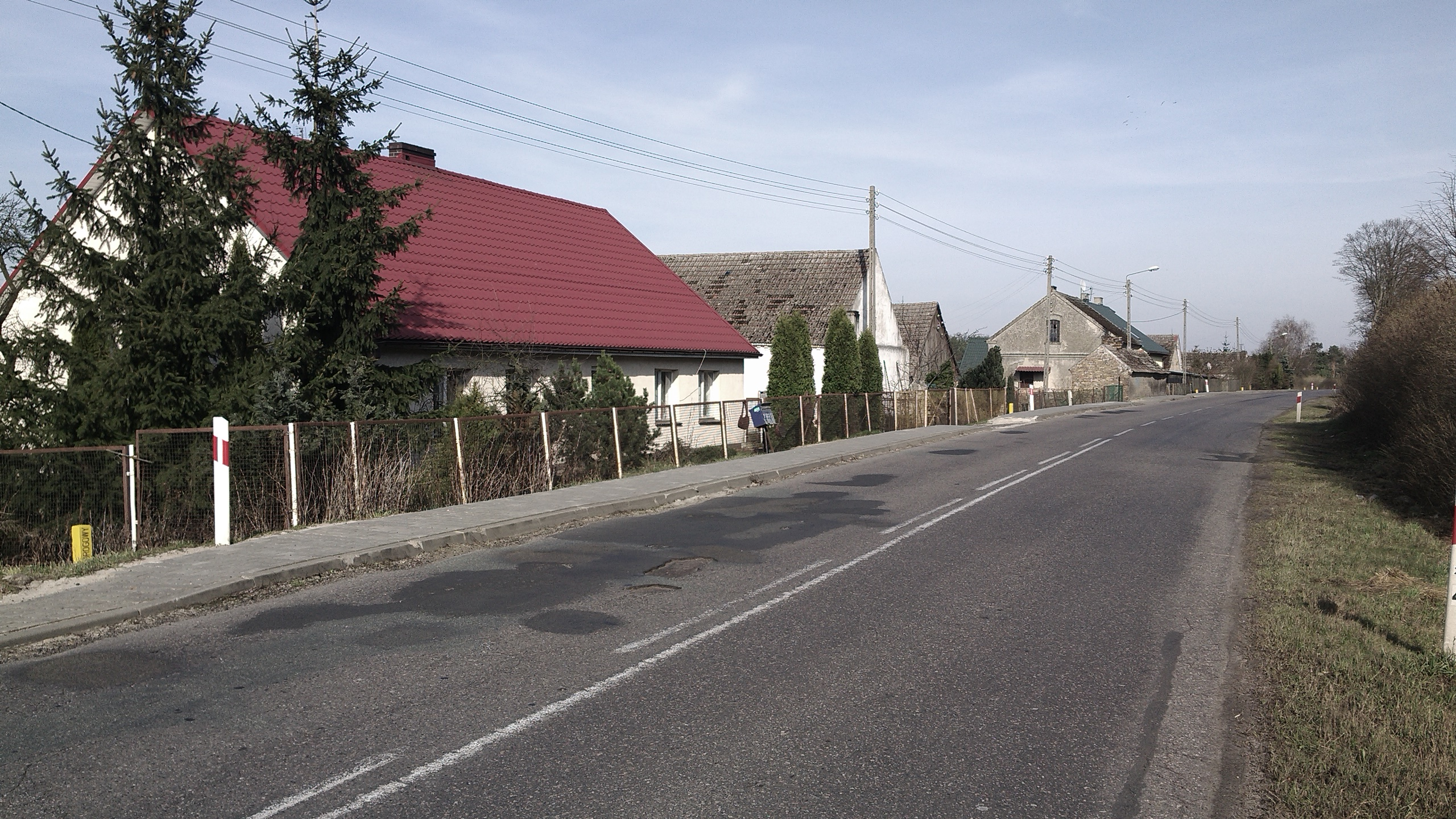
- Street of Ludzisławice

- Location within Poland
- Coordinates: 52°43′18″N 15°29′10″E
- Country: Poland
- Voivodeship: Lubusz
- County: Gorzów
- Gmina: Santok

Ludzisławice [lud͡ʑiswaˈvit͡sɛ] is a village in the administrative district of Gmina Santok, within Gorzów County, Lubusz Voivodeship, in western Poland.
