= Płomykowo =

- Village
- Location within Poland
- Coordinates: 52°46′N 15°26′E
- Country: Poland
- Voivodeship: Lubusz
- County: Gorzów
- Gmina: Santok

Płomykowo [pwɔmɨˈkɔvɔ] is a village in the administrative district of Gmina Santok, within Gorzów County, Lubusz Voivodeship, in western Poland.
