= Buszów, Gorzów County =

Buszów
- Village
- Location within Poland
- Coordinates: 52°47′N 14°51′E
- Country: Poland
- Voivodeship: Lubusz
- County: Gorzów
- Gmina: Lubiszyn

Buszów [ˈbuʂuf] is a village in the administrative district of Gmina Lubiszyn, within Gorzów County, Lubusz Voivodeship, in western Poland.
