= Deszczno =

- Village
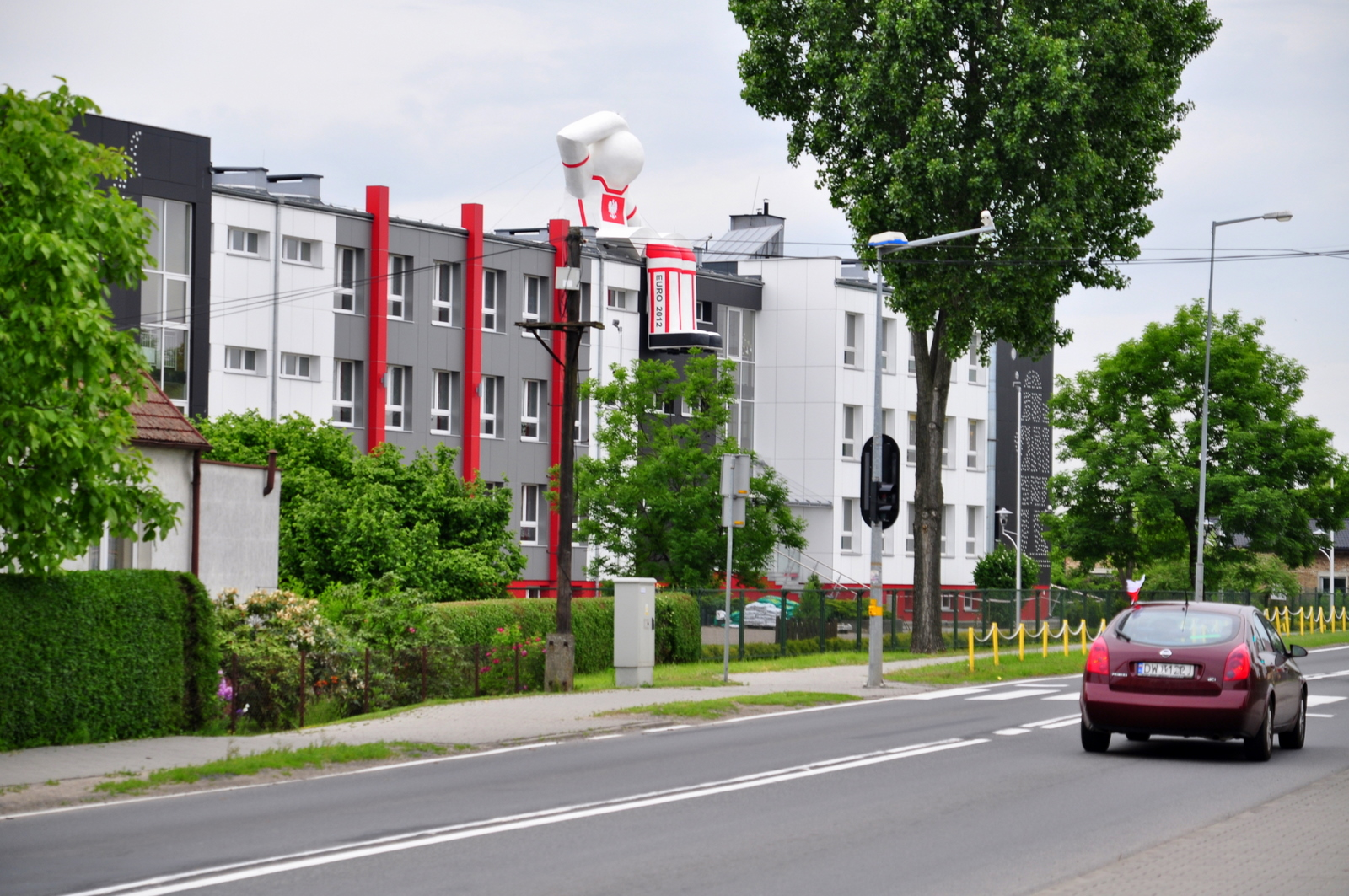
- Local school during EURO 2012 football championships

- Location within Poland
- Coordinates: 52°40′N 15°19′E
- Country: Poland
- Voivodeship: Lubusz
- County: Gorzów
- Gmina: Deszczno

Population
  - Total: 1,100
- Time zone: UTC+1 (CET)
  - Summer (DST): UTC+2 (CEST)
- Postal code: 66-446
- Website: http://www.deszczno.pl

Deszczno [ˈdɛʂt͡ʂnɔ] is a village in Gorzów County, Lubusz Voivodeship, in western Poland. It is the seat of the gmina (administrative district) called Gmina Deszczno.

== History ==
The area became part of the emerging Polish state in the 10th century. Following Poland's fragmentation, it formed part of the Duchy of Greater Poland. Later on, the area passed to Brandenburg, Bohemia (Czechia), Prussia, and Germany. The settlement was first mentioned in 1344 deed issued by Margrave Louis of Brandenburg, granting it to the city of Landsberg (Gorzów Wielkopolski). In the past it was also known in Polish as Deszna.
