= Lubiszyn =

- Village
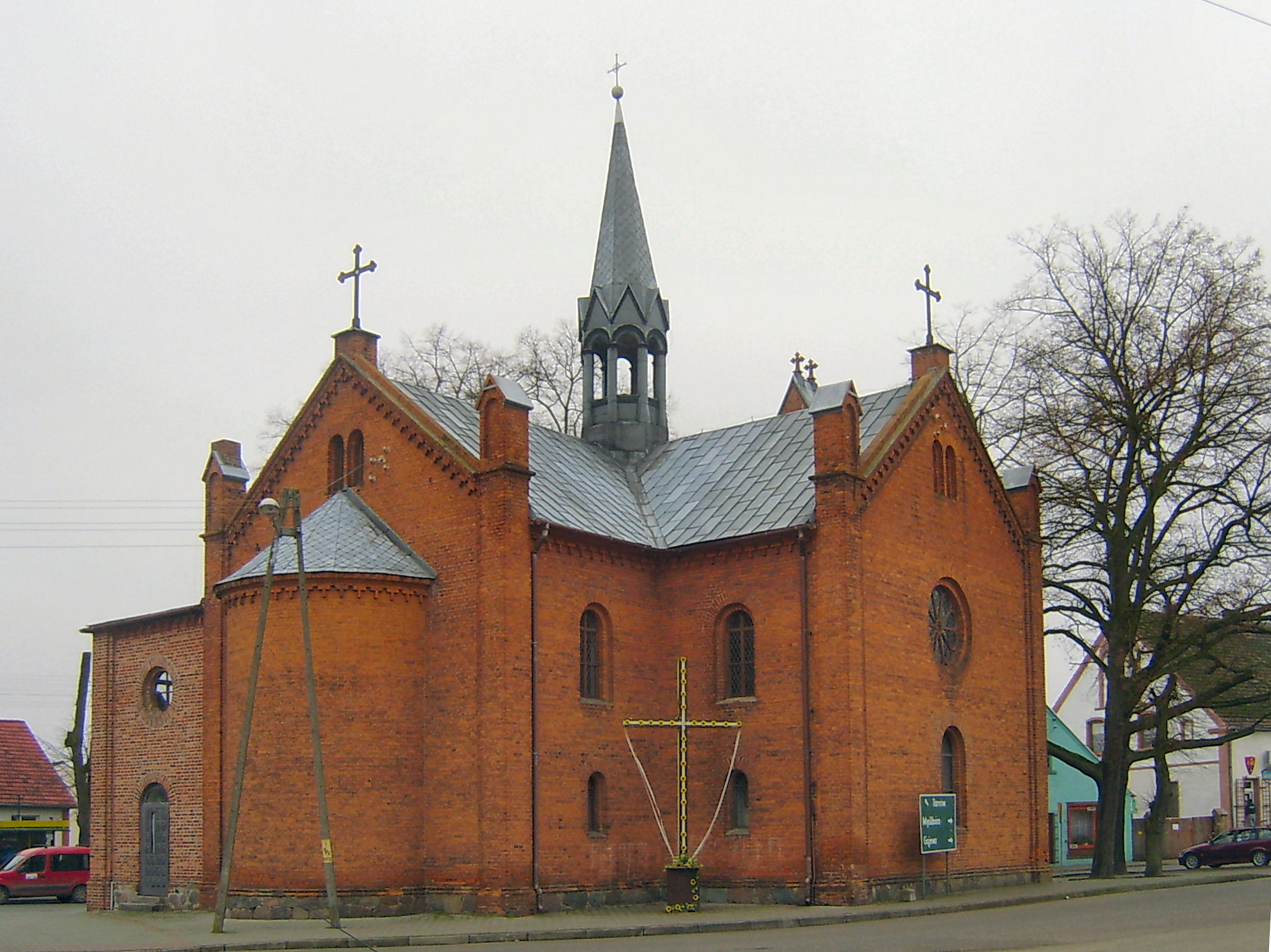
- Church of the Assumption of the Virgin Mary

- Location within Poland
- Coordinates: 52°46′N 14°56′E
- Country: Poland
- Voivodeship: Lubusz
- County: Gorzów
- Gmina: Lubiszyn

Population
  - Total: 800

Lubiszyn [luˈbiʂɨn] is a village in Gorzów County, Lubusz Voivodeship, in western Poland. It is the seat of the gmina (administrative district) called Gmina Lubiszyn.
