= Gmina Lubiszyn =

Gmina Lubiszyn Lubiszyn Commune
- Gmina
- Coat of arms
- Interactive map of Gmina Lubiszyn
- Coordinates (Lubiszyn): 52°46′48″N 14°56′53″E
- Country: Poland
- Voivodeship: Lubusz
- County: Gorzów
- Seat: Lubiszyn

Area
  - Total: 205.3 km^{2} (79.3 sq mi)

Population (2019-06-30)
  - Total: 6,830
  - Density: 33.3/km^{2} (86.2/sq mi)
- Website: https://www.lubiszyn.pl

Gmina Lubiszyn is a rural gmina (administrative district) in Gorzów County, Lubusz Voivodeship, in western Poland. Its seat is the village of Lubiszyn, which lies approximately 21 kilometres (13 mi) west of Gorzów Wielkopolski.

The gmina covers an area of 205.3 square kilometres (79.3 sq mi), and as of 2019 its total population is 6,830.

== Villages ==
Gmina Lubiszyn contains the villages and settlements of Baczyna, Brzeźno, Buszów, Chłopiny, Dzikowo, Gajewo, Jastrzębiec, Kozin, Łąkomin, Lubiszyn, Lubno, Marwice, Mystki, Podlesie, Ściechów, Ściechówek, Smoliny, Staw, Tarnów, Wysoka and Zacisze.

== Neighbouring gminas ==
Gmina Lubiszyn is bordered by the city of Gorzów Wielkopolski and by the gminas of Bogdaniec, Dębno, Kłodawa, Myślibórz, Nowogródek Pomorski and Witnica.

== Twin towns – sister cities ==
Gmina Lubiszyn is twinned with:

- Odervorland, Germany
