= Gmina Deszczno =

Gmina Deszczno Deszczno Commune
- Gmina
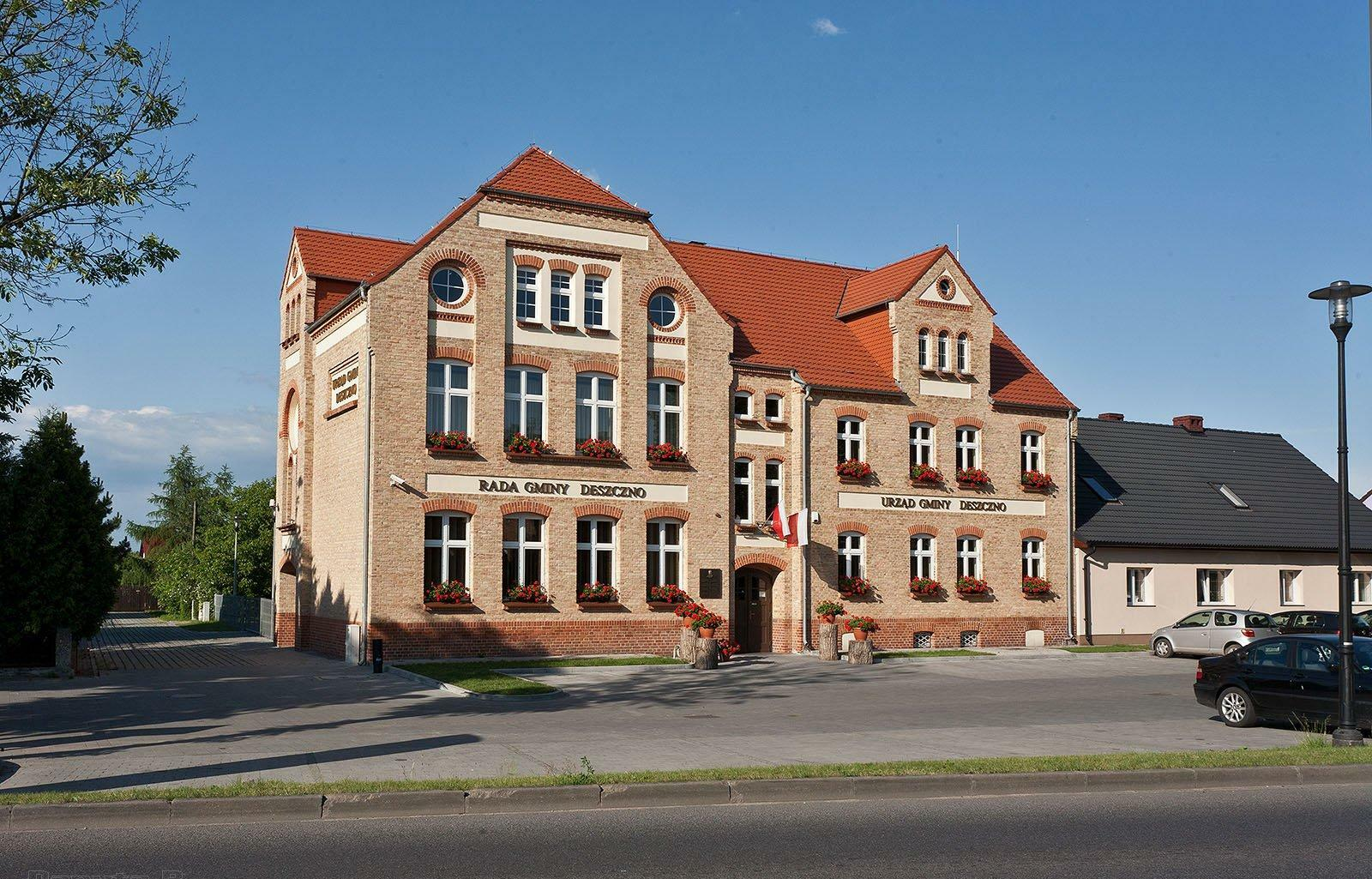
- Gmina office in Deszczno

- Flag Coat of arms
- Interactive map of Gmina Deszczno
- Coordinates (Deszczno): 52°40′N 15°19′E
- Country: Poland
- Voivodeship: Lubusz
- County: Gorzów
- Seat: Deszczno

Area
  - Total: 168.35 km^{2} (65.00 sq mi)

Population (2019-06-30)
  - Total: 9,865
  - Density: 58.60/km^{2} (151.8/sq mi)
- Time zone: UTC+1 (CET)
  - Summer (DST): UTC+2 (CEST)
- Website: http://www.deszczno.pl/

Gmina Deszczno is a rural gmina (administrative district) in Gorzów County, Lubusz Voivodeship, in western Poland. Its seat is the village of Deszczno, which lies approximately 9 kilometres (6 mi) south-east of Gorzów Wielkopolski.

The gmina covers an area of 168.35 square kilometres (65.0 sq mi), and as of 2019 its total population is 9,865.

== Villages ==
Gmina Deszczno contains the villages and settlements of Białobłocie, Bolemin, Borek, Brzozowiec, Ciecierzyce, Deszczno, Dziersławice, Dzierżów, Glinik, Karnin, Kiełpin, Koszęcin, Krasowiec, Łagodzin, Maszewo, Niwica, Orzelec, Osiedle Poznańskie, Płonica, Prądocin and Ulim.

Population of villages and settlements of Gmina Deszczno; 2021 census
Locality	Population
Osiedle Poznańskie	1,464
Deszczno	1,350
Karnin	797
Ciecierzyce	769
Glinik	723
Brzozowiec	695
Ulim	610
Łagodzin	513
Dzierżów	502
Bolemin	460
Prądocin	441
Maszewo	400
Borek	361
Krasowiec	255
Białobłocie	247
Płonica	180
Kiełpin	132
Orzelec	107
Dziersławice	105
Koszęcin	74
Niwica	46
Gmina Deszczno	10,231

== Neighbouring gminas ==
Gmina Deszczno is bordered by the city of Gorzów Wielkopolski and by the gminas of Bledzew, Bogdaniec, Krzeszyce, Lubniewice, Santok and Skwierzyna.

== Twin towns – sister cities ==
Gmina Deszczno is twinned with:

- Borkheide, Germany
