= Maszewo, Gorzów County =

Maszewo
- Village
- Location within Poland
- Coordinates: 52°39′53″N 15°18′28″E
- Country: Poland
- Voivodeship: Lubusz
- County: Gorzów
- Gmina: Deszczno

Maszewo [maˈʂɛvɔ] is a village in the administrative district of Gmina Deszczno, within Gorzów County, Lubusz Voivodeship, in western Poland.
