= Jastrzębnik, Lubusz Voivodeship =

Jastrzębnik
- Village
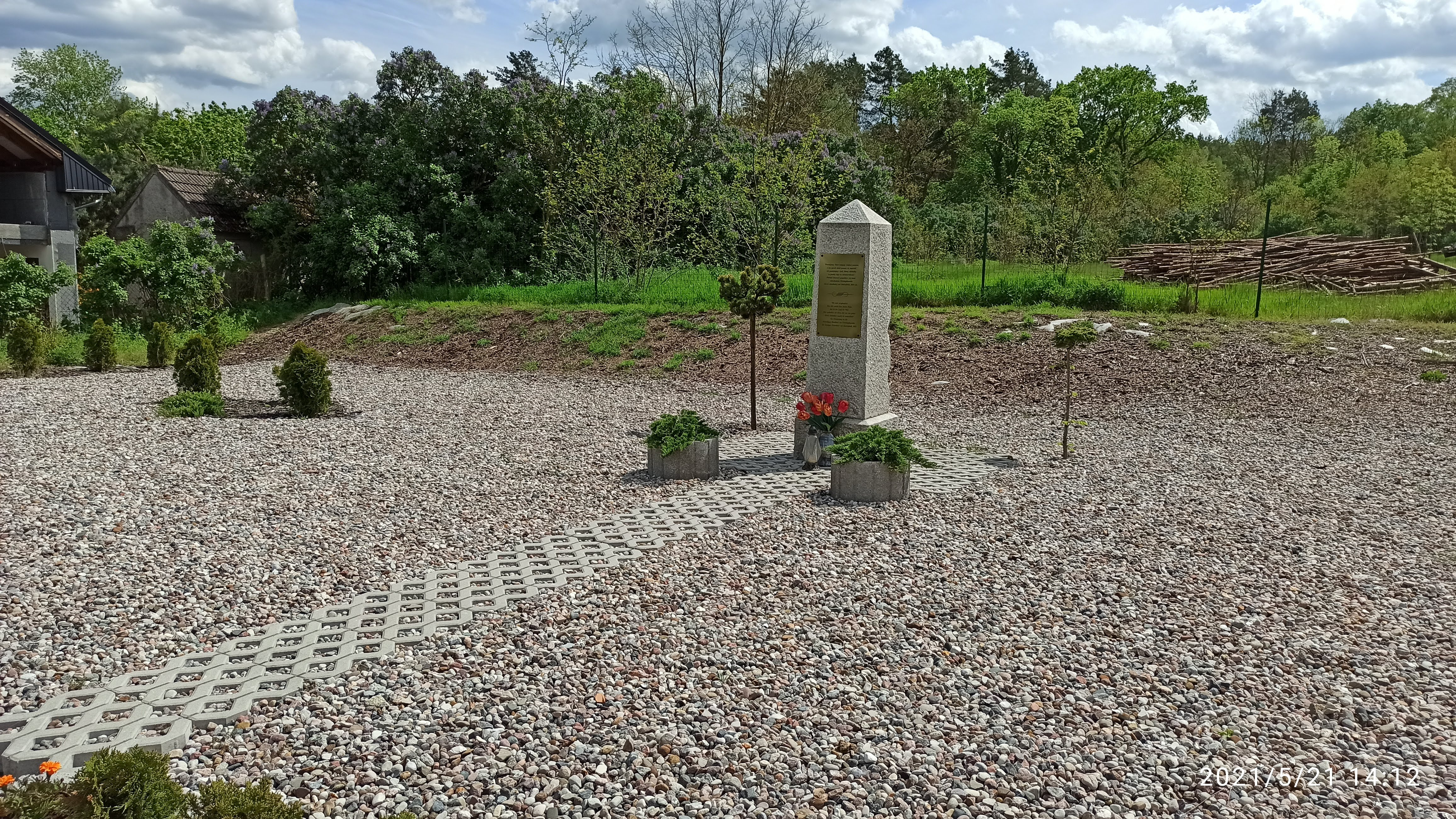

- Location within Poland
- Coordinates: 52°43′28″N 15°35′35″E
- Country: Poland
- Voivodeship: Lubusz
- County: Gorzów
- Gmina: Santok

Jastrzębnik [jasˈtʂɛmbnik] is a village in the administrative district of Gmina Santok, within Gorzów County, Lubusz Voivodeship, in western Poland.
