= Borek, Gorzów County =

Borek
- Village
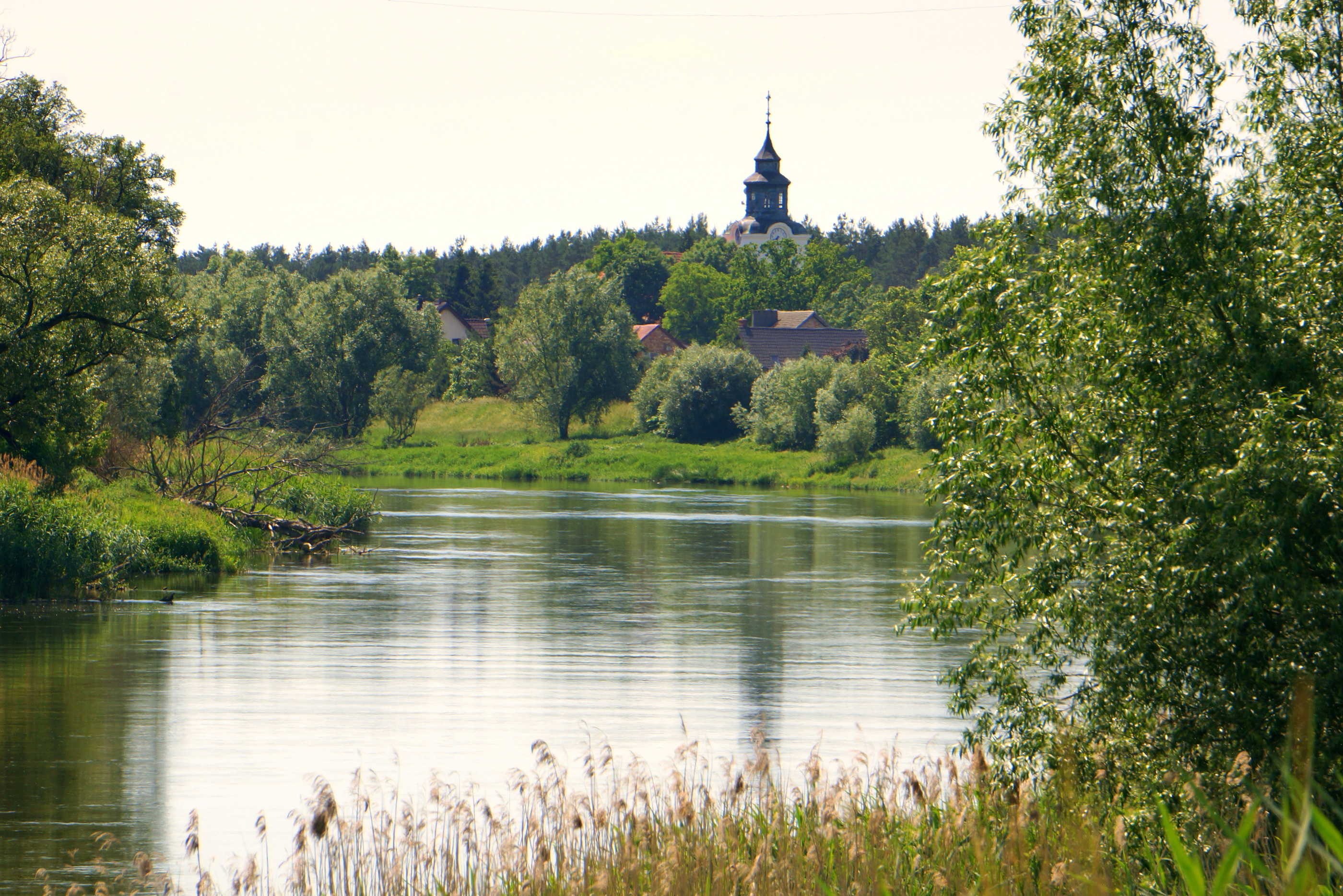
- Warta River in Borek

- Location within Poland
- Coordinates: 52°41′N 15°23′E
- Country: Poland
- Voivodeship: Lubusz
- County: Gorzów
- Gmina: Deszczno
- Time zone: UTC+1 (CET)
  - Summer (DST): UTC+2 (CEST)
- Vehicle registration: FGW

Borek [ˈbɔrɛk] is a village in the administrative district of Gmina Deszczno, within Gorzów County, Lubusz Voivodeship, in western Poland.

== History ==
The area became part of the emerging Polish state in the 10th century. Following Poland's fragmentation, it formed part of the Duchy of Greater Poland. Later on, the area passed to Brandenburg, Bohemia (Czechia), Prussia, and Germany. Following Germany's defeat in World War II in 1945, the area became again part of Poland.
