= Gmina Santok =

Gmina Santok Santok Commune
- Gmina
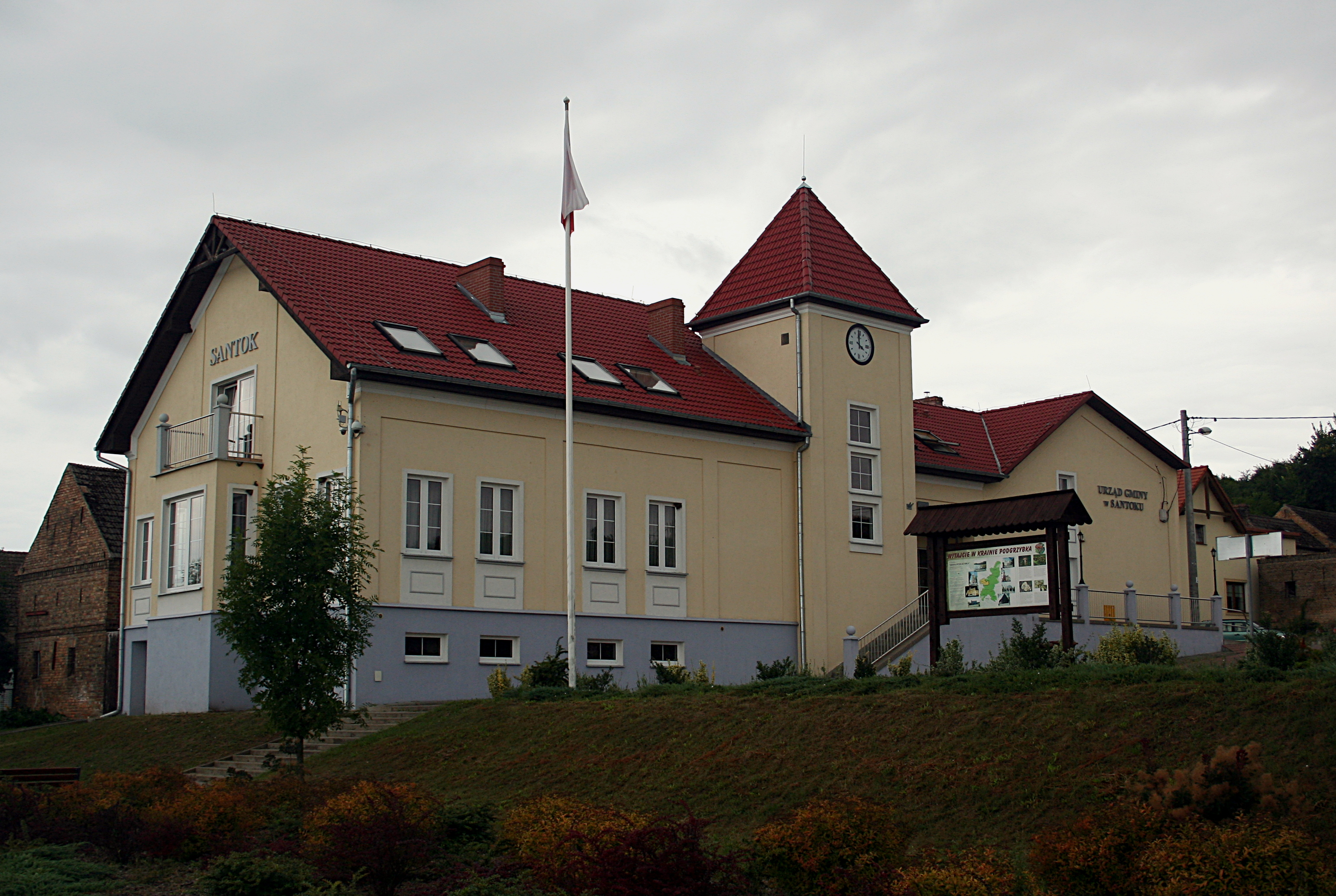

- Coat of arms
- Interactive map of Gmina Santok
- Coordinates (Santok): 52°44′20″N 15°25′0″E
- Country: Poland
- Voivodeship: Lubusz
- County: Gorzów
- Seat: Santok

Area
  - Total: 168.3 km^{2} (65.0 sq mi)

Population (2019-06-30)
  - Total: 8,580
  - Density: 51.0/km^{2} (132/sq mi)
- Website: http://www.santok.pl

Gmina Santok is a rural gmina (administrative district) in Gorzów County, Lubusz Voivodeship, in western Poland. Its seat is the village of Santok, which lies approximately 12 kilometres (7 mi) east of Gorzów Wielkopolski.

The gmina covers an area of 168.3 square kilometres (65.0 sq mi), and as of 2019 its total population is 8,580.

== Villages ==
Gmina Santok contains the villages and settlements of Baranowice, Czechów, Górki, Gralewo, Janczewo, Jastrzębnik, Lipki Małe, Lipki Wielkie, Ludzisławice, Mąkoszyce, Nowe Polichno, Płomykowo, Santok, Stare Polichno and Wawrów.

== Neighbouring gminas ==
Gmina Santok is bordered by the city of Gorzów Wielkopolski and by the gminas of Deszczno, Drezdenko, Kłodawa, Skwierzyna, Strzelce Krajeńskie and Zwierzyn.

== Twin towns – sister cities ==
Gmina Santok is twinned with:

- Gusow-Platkow, Germany
