= Białobłocie, Lubusz Voivodeship =

Białobłocie
- Village
- Location within Poland
- Coordinates: 52°39′N 15°15′E
- Country: Poland
- Voivodeship: Lubusz
- County: Gorzów
- Gmina: Deszczno

Białobłocie ([bjawɔˈbwɔt͡ɕɛ]; German: Bürgerbruch) is a village in the administrative district of Gmina Deszczno, within Gorzów County, Lubusz Voivodeship, in western Poland.
