= Gorzów County =

Gorzów County Powiat gorzowski
- County
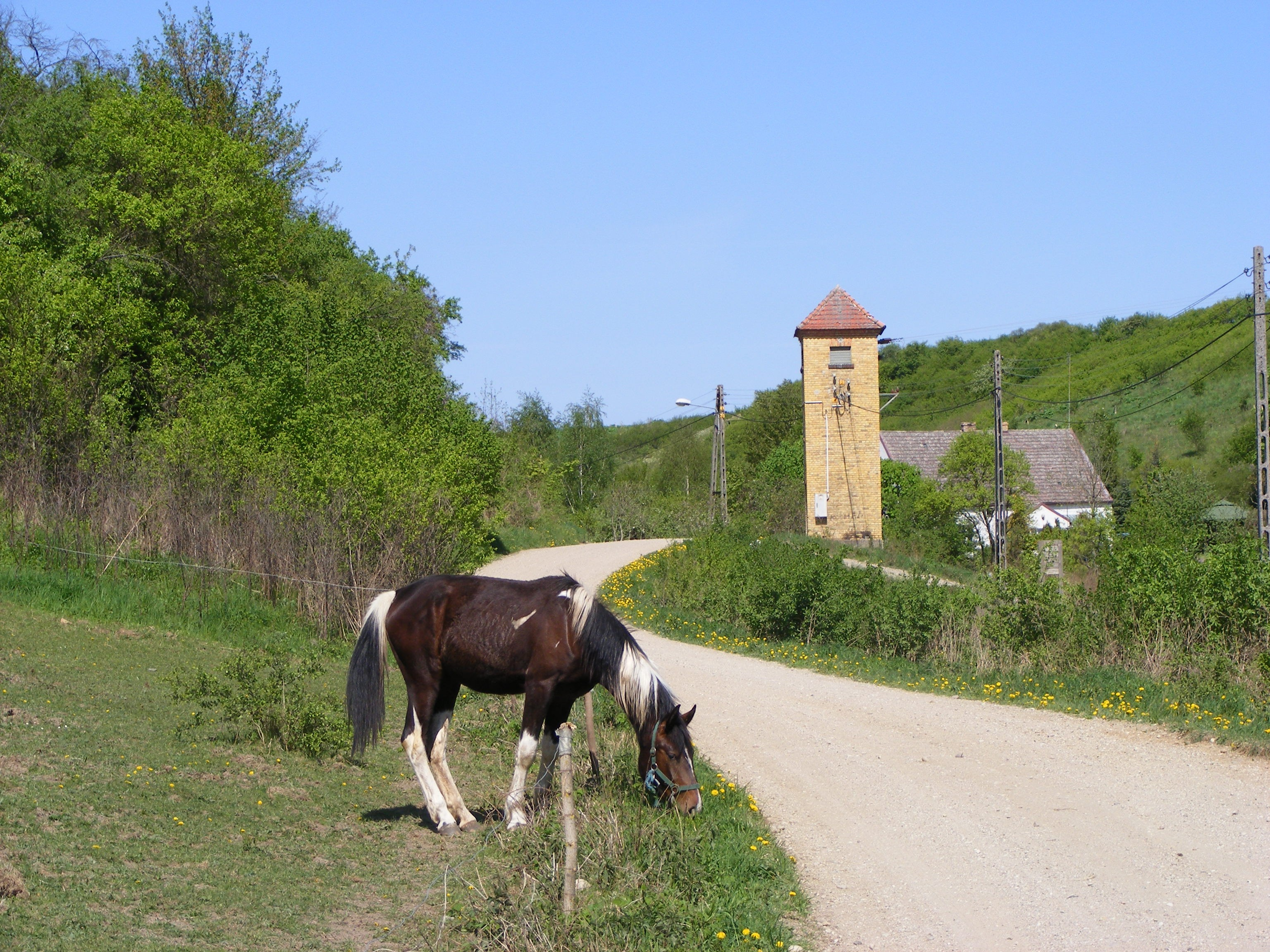

- Flag Coat of arms

- Location within the voivodeship
- Coordinates (Gorzów Wielkopolski): 52°44′N 15°15′E
- Country: Poland
- Voivodeship: Lubusz
- Seat: Gorzów Wielkopolski
- Gminas: Total 7 (incl. 1 urban): Kostrzyn nad Odrą; Gmina Bogdaniec; Gmina Deszczno; Gmina Kłodawa; Gmina Lubiszyn; Gmina Santok; Gmina Witnica

Area
  - Total: 1,213.32 km^{2} (468.47 sq mi)

Population (2019-06-30)
  - Total: 71,669
  - Density: 59.069/km^{2} (152.99/sq mi)
  - Urban: 24,525
  - Rural: 47,144
- Car plates: FGW
- Website: http://www.powiatgorzowski.pl/

Gorzów County (Polish: powiat gorzowski) is a unit of territorial administration and local government (powiat) in Lubusz Voivodeship, western Poland. It came into being on 1 January 1999 as a result of the Polish local government reforms passed in 1998. Its administrative seat is the city of Gorzów Wielkopolski, although the city is not part of the county (it constitutes a separate city county). The only towns in Gorzów County are Kostrzyn nad Odrą, which lies 43 km (27 mi) west of Gorzów Wielkopolski, and Witnica, 25 km (16 mi) west of Gorzów Wielkopolski.

The county covers an area of 1,213.32 square kilometres (468.5 sq mi). As of 2019 its total population is 71,669, out of which the population of Kostrzyn nad Odrą is 17,778, that of Witnica is 6,747, and the rural population is 47,144.

== Neighbouring counties ==
Apart from the city of Gorzów Wielkopolski, Gorzów County is also bordered by Strzelce-Drezdenko County to the north-east, Międzyrzecz County to the south-east, Sulęcin County to the south, Słubice County to the south-west and Myślibórz County to the north-west. It also borders Brandenburg in Germany.

== Administrative divisions ==
The county is subdivided into seven gminas (one urban, one urban-rural and five rural). These are listed in the following table, in descending order of population.

Gmina	Type	Area (km^{2})	Population (2019)	Seat
Kostrzyn nad Odrą	urban	46.2	17,778	
Gmina Witnica	urban-rural	278.3	12,864	Witnica
Gmina Deszczno	rural	168.4	9,865	Deszczno
Gmina Kłodawa	rural	234.8	8,635	Kłodawa
Gmina Santok	rural	168.3	8,580	Santok
Gmina Bogdaniec	rural	112.1	7,117	Bogdaniec
Gmina Lubiszyn	rural	205.3	6,830	Lubiszyn
