= Oksza =

Oksza may refer to:

- Oksza coat of arms
- Oksza, Lubusz Voivodeship (west Poland)
