= Tarnówek =

Tarnówek may refer to the following places in Poland:

- Tarnówek, Lower Silesian Voivodeship (south-west Poland)
- Tarnówek, Masovian Voivodeship (east-central Poland)
- Tarnówek, Gorzów County in Lubusz Voivodeship (west Poland)
- Tarnówek, Wschowa County in Lubusz Voivodeship (west Poland)
