= Mościce (disambiguation) =

Mościce is a borough of Tarnów in southern Poland.

Mościce may also refer to the following villages:

- Mościce, Lubusz Voivodeship (west Poland)
- Mościce, Masovian Voivodeship (east-central Poland)
