= Dąbroszyn, Lubusz Voivodeship =

Dąbroszyn
- Village
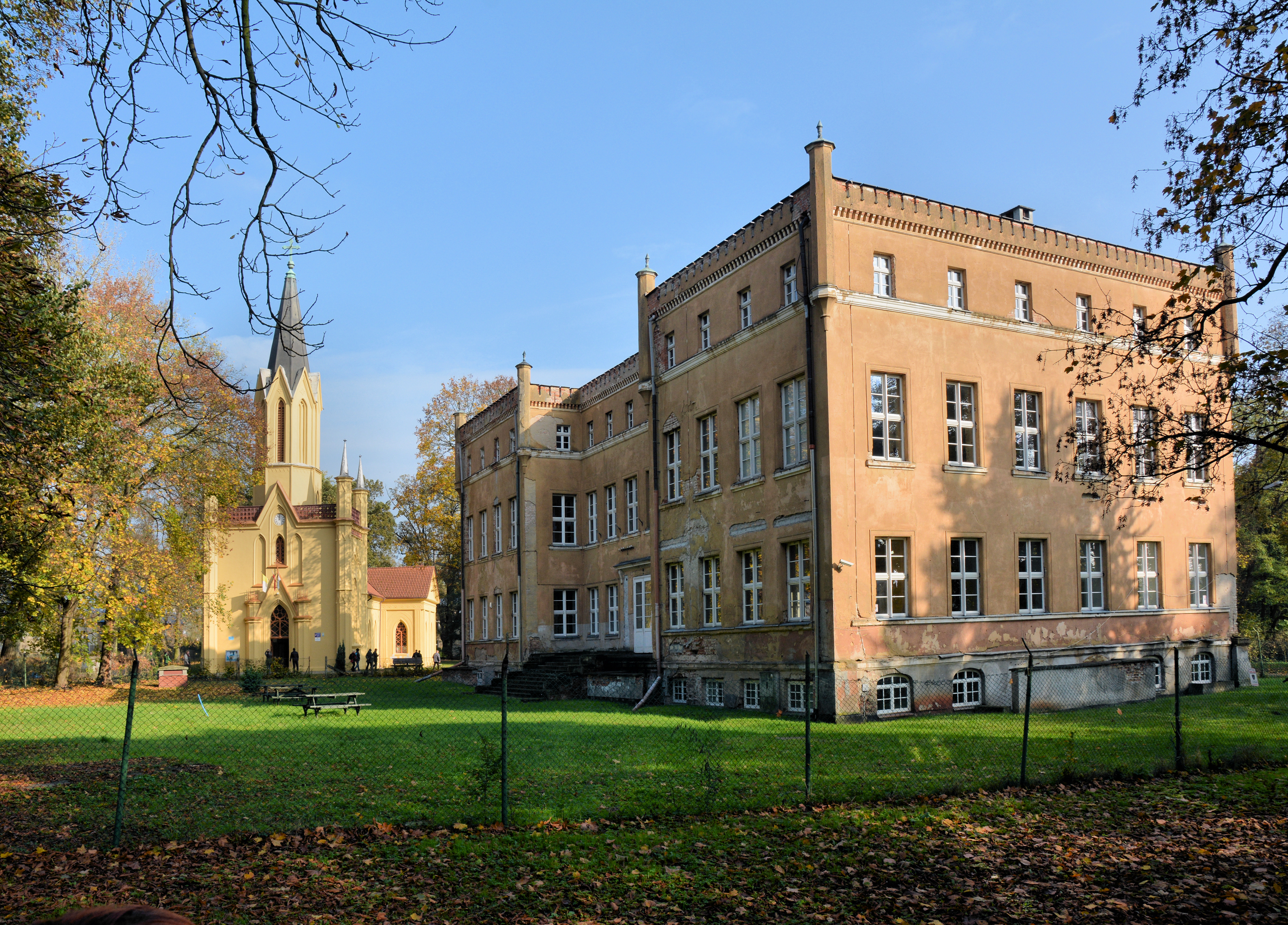
- Saint Joseph church and Dąbroszyn Palace

- Location within Poland
- Coordinates: 52°37′13″N 14°42′19″E
- Country: Poland
- Voivodeship: Lubusz
- County: Gorzów
- Gmina: Witnica
- Population: 820
- Time zone: UTC+1 (CET)
  - Summer (DST): UTC+2 (CEST)
- Vehicle registration: FGW

Dąbroszyn [dɔmˈbrɔʂɨn] (German: Tamsel) is a village in the administrative district of Gmina Witnica, within Gorzów County, Lubusz Voivodeship, in western Poland. It is part of historic Lubusz Land.

The local landmark is the Dąbroszyn Palace.

== Notable residents ==
- Hans Adam von Schöning (1641–1696), Prussian and Saxon Generalfeldmarschall
- Luise Eleonore Wreech (1708–1784), Prussian noblewoman
