= Mosina (disambiguation) =

Mosina is a town in Greater Poland Voivodeship (west-central Poland).

Mosina may also refer to:

- Mosina, Lubusz Voivodeship (west Poland)
- Mosina, Stargard County in West Pomeranian Voivodeship (north-west Poland)
- Mosina, Szczecinek County in West Pomeranian Voivodeship (north-west Poland)
