= Kamień Mały =

Kamień Mały may refer to the following places:

- Kamień Mały, Lubusz Voivodeship (west Poland)
- Kamień Mały, Masovian Voivodeship (east-central Poland)
- Kamień Mały, Warmian-Masurian Voivodeship (north Poland)
