= Witnica =

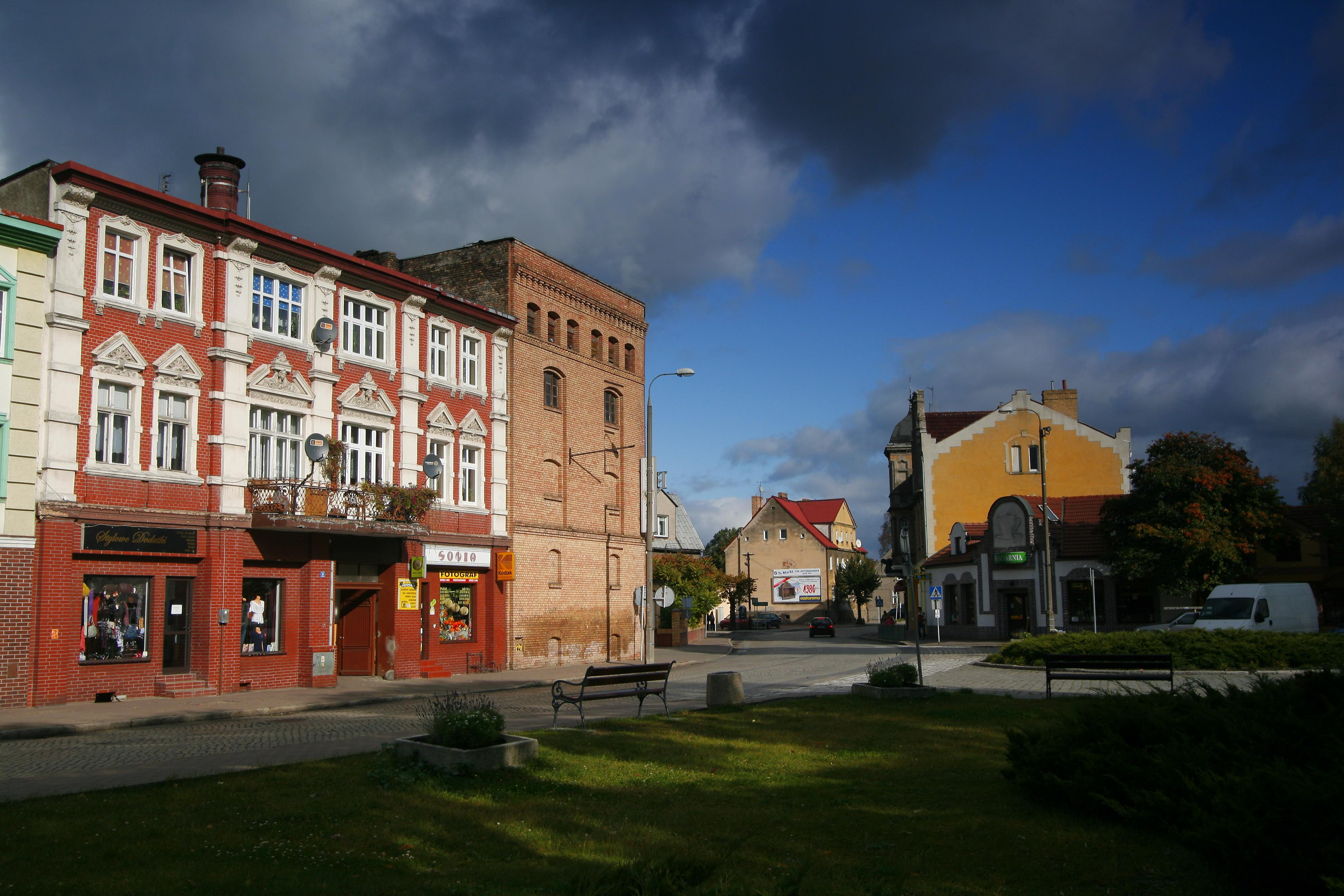
- Town center

- Flag Coat of arms

- Location within Poland
- Coordinates: 52°40′40″N 14°53′29″E
- Country: Poland
- Voivodeship: Lubusz
- County: Gorzów
- Gmina: Witnica

Area
  - Total: 8.21 km^{2} (3.17 sq mi)

Population (2019-06-30)
  - Total: 6,747
  - Density: 822/km^{2} (2,130/sq mi)
- Time zone: UTC+1 (CET)
  - Summer (DST): UTC+2 (CEST)
- Postal code: 66-460
- Climate: Cfb
- Website: http://www.witnica.pl

Witnica [vitˈnit͡sa] (German: Vietz in Ostbrandenburg) is a town in western Poland, situated in the Lubusz Voivodeship, with 6,747 inhabitants (2019).

The town is located in the historic Lubusz Land. The town's name derives from the Polish words wić or witka, meaning a willow twig or a type of willow.

== History ==
Along with Lubusz Land it was part of medieval Poland, and later it was also under the rule of Brandenburg, the Czech Crown, Prussia, and between 1871 and 1945 it was part of Germany, located in the Prussian Province of Brandenburg. The Germans brought Polish prisoners of war for forced labour to the town during World War II. In the final stages of World War II, half of the population fled before the Red Army captured the town in February 1945. Polish POWs were liberated.

After Nazi Germany's defeat in World War II, the area was reintegrated into Poland. The remaining German population was expelled in accordance with the Potsdam Agreement. New Polish settlers, mostly expellees from the former eastern territories annexed by the Soviet Union, moved to the town. War damage was not significant, reaching 8% of the buildings. The ruins were dismantled to obtain bricks for the reconstruction of Warsaw destroyed by the Germans.

== Economy ==
The town is known for its brewery (Browar Witnica), established in 1848.

== Culture ==
A Polish military museum (Muzeum Chwały Oręża Polskiego) is located in Witnica.

== Sports ==
Witnica is home to football club Czarni Witnica, which competes in the Polish lower leagues.

== Twin towns – sister cities ==
See twin towns of Gmina Witnica.

== People ==
- Johannes Schüler (1894–1966), German conductor

== Gallery ==
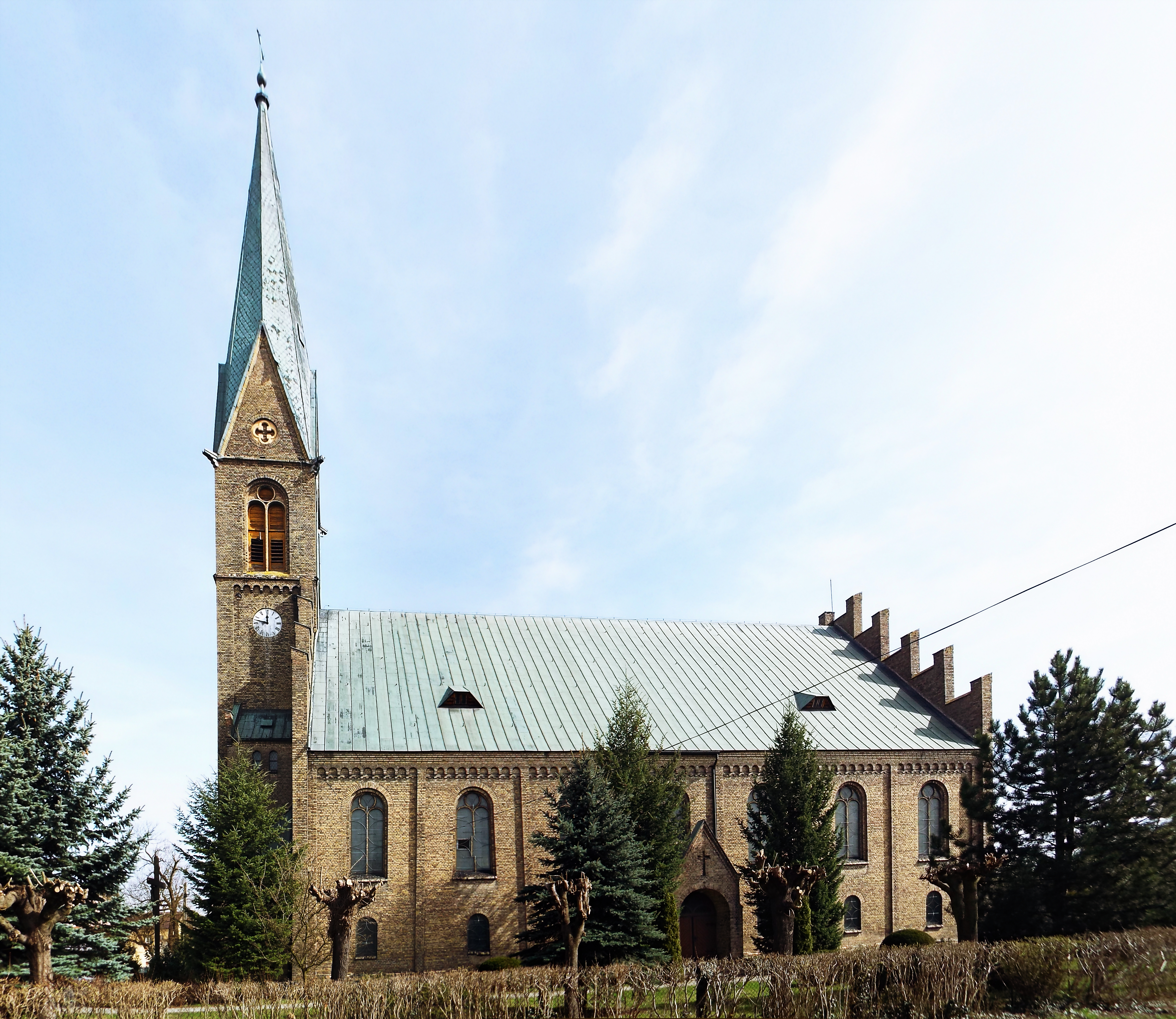
Our Lady of Perpetual Help church

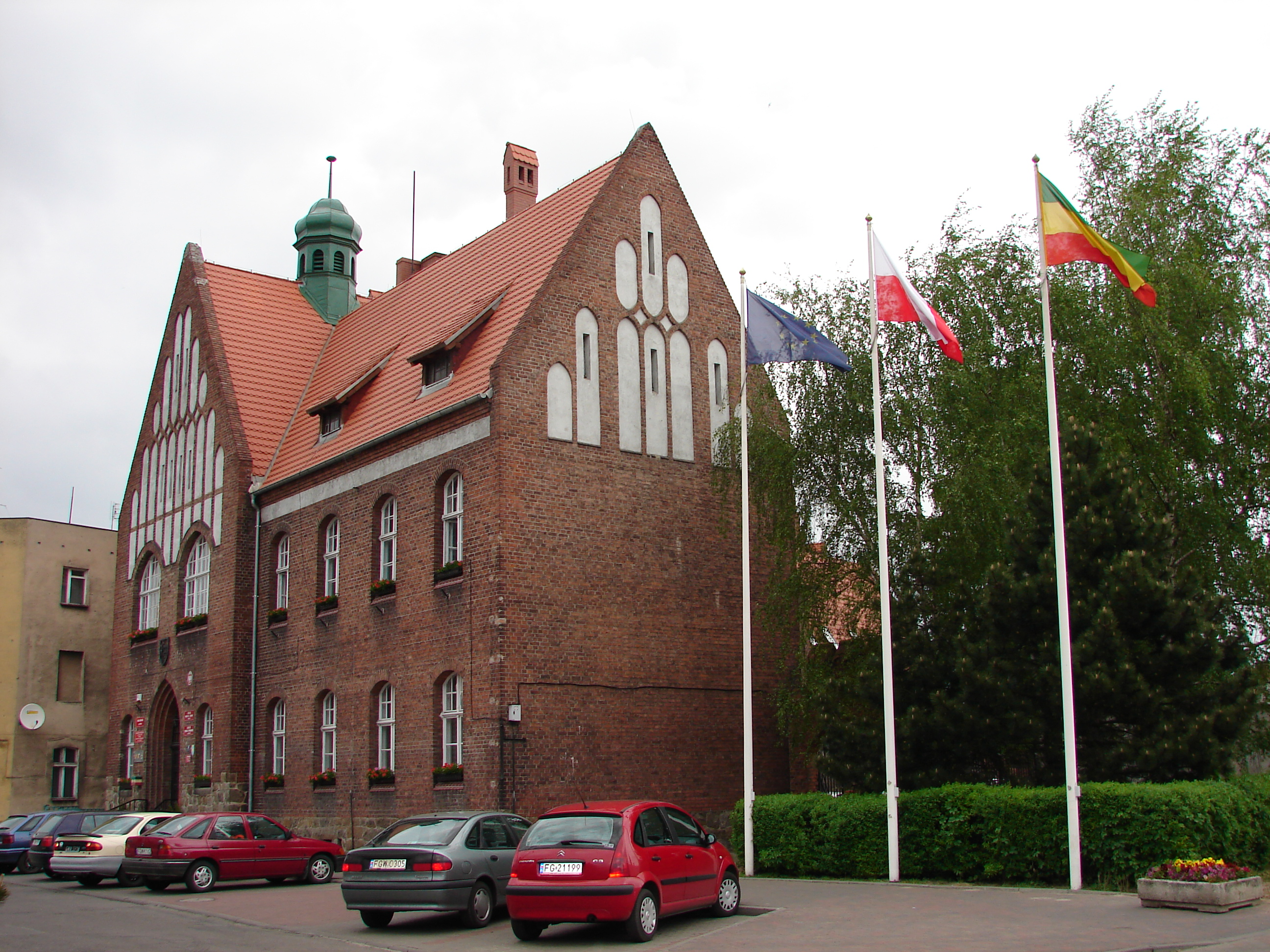
Town hall

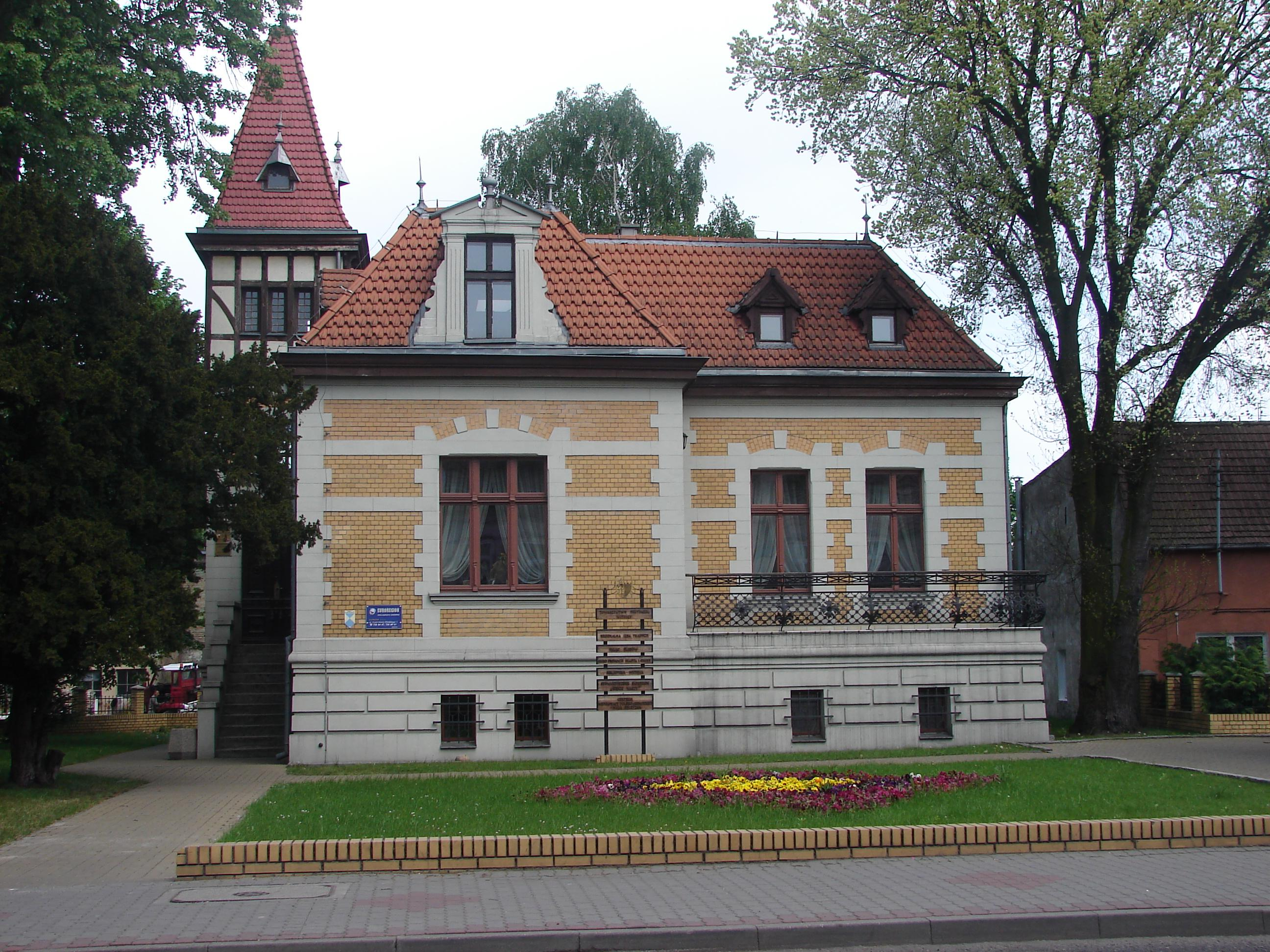
Yellow Palace (Żółty Pałacyk)

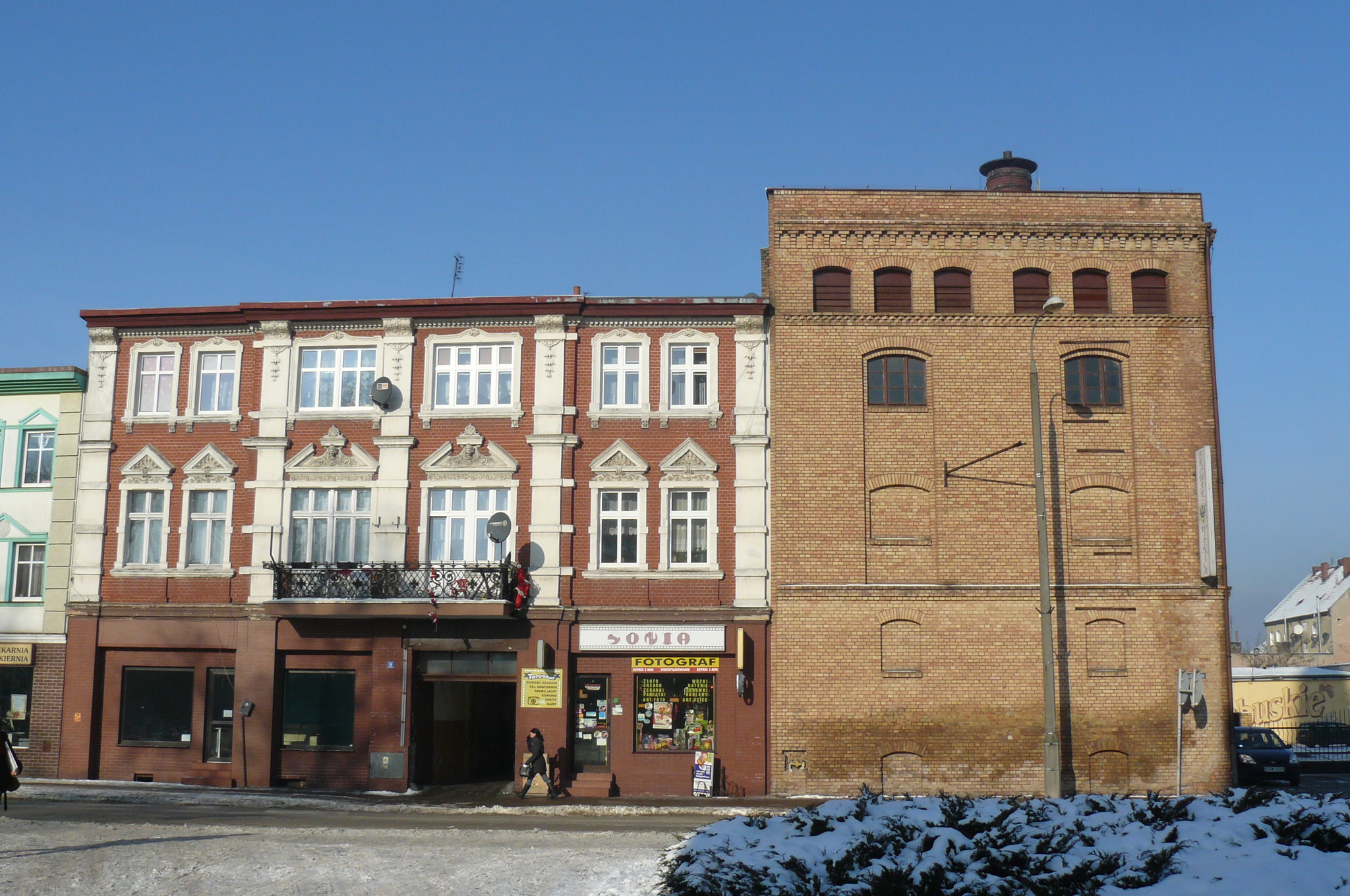
An old townhouse and the Witnica Brewery (Browar Witnica)
