= Sosny, Poland =

Sosny
- Village
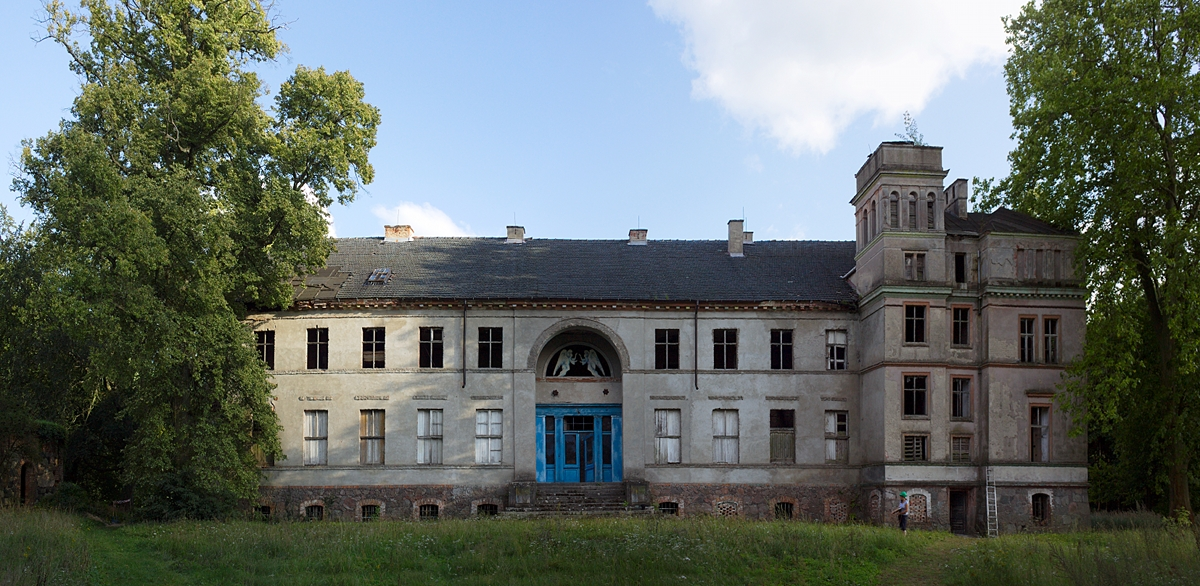
- Manor

- Location within Poland
- Coordinates: 52°43′N 14°57′E
- Country: Poland
- Voivodeship: Lubusz
- County: Gorzów
- Gmina: Witnica

Sosny ([ˈsɔsnɨ]; German: Charlottenhof) is a village in the administrative district of Gmina Witnica, within Gorzów County, Lubusz Voivodeship, in western Poland.
