= Kłopotowo, Lubusz Voivodeship =

Kłopotowo
- Village
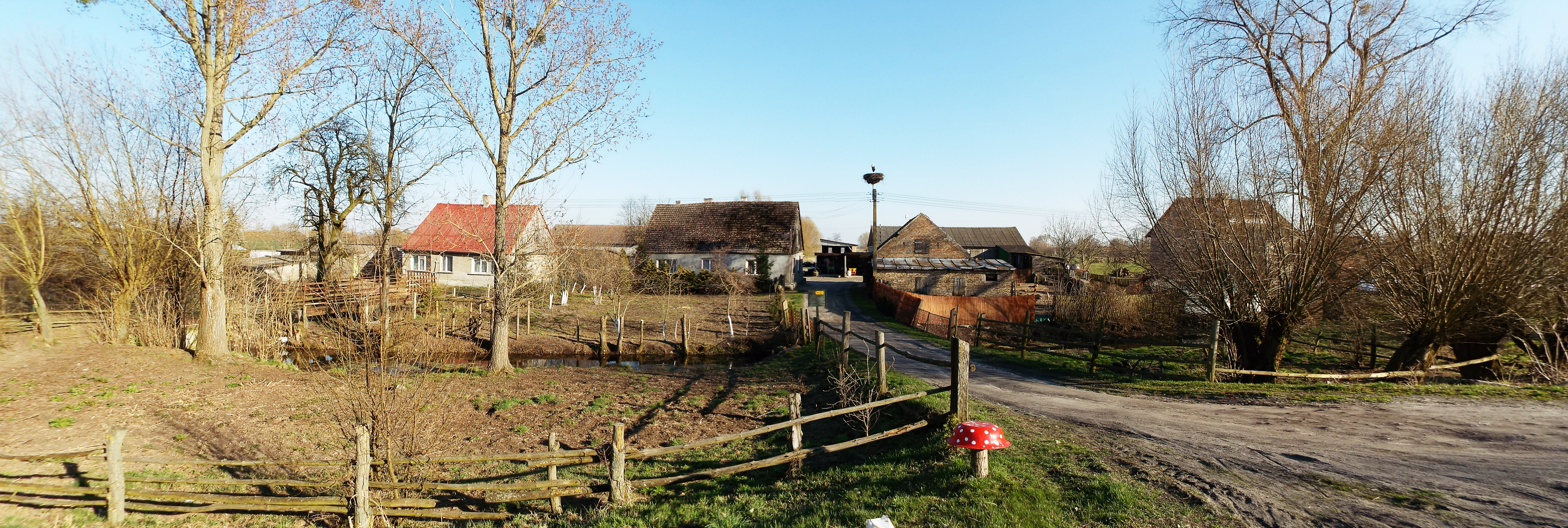

- Location within Poland
- Coordinates: 52°37′N 14°53′E
- Country: Poland
- Voivodeship: Lubusz
- County: Gorzów
- Gmina: Witnica

Kłopotowo ([kwɔpɔˈtɔvɔ]; German: Schützensorge) is a village in the administrative district of Gmina Witnica, within Gorzów County, Lubusz Voivodeship, in western Poland.
