= Białczyk =

- Village
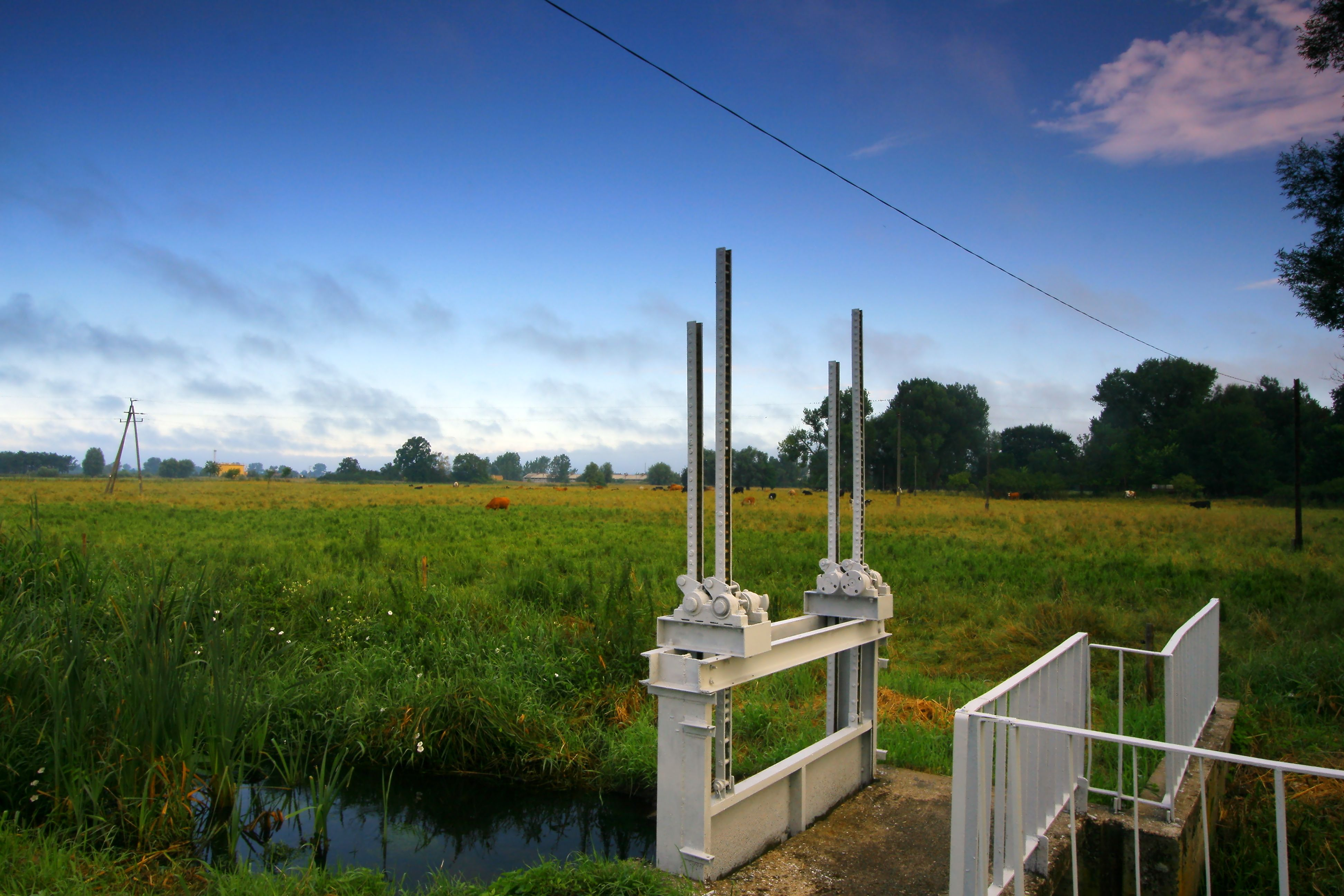

- Location within Poland
- Coordinates: 52°39′N 14°55′E
- Country: Poland
- Voivodeship: Lubusz
- County: Gorzów
- Gmina: Witnica
- Elevation: 55 m (180 ft)

Białczyk ([ˈbjau̯t͡ʂɨk]; German: Neu Balz) is a village in the administrative district of Gmina Witnica, within Gorzów County, Lubusz Voivodeship, in western Poland.
