= Świerkocin, Lubusz Voivodeship =

Świerkocin
- Village
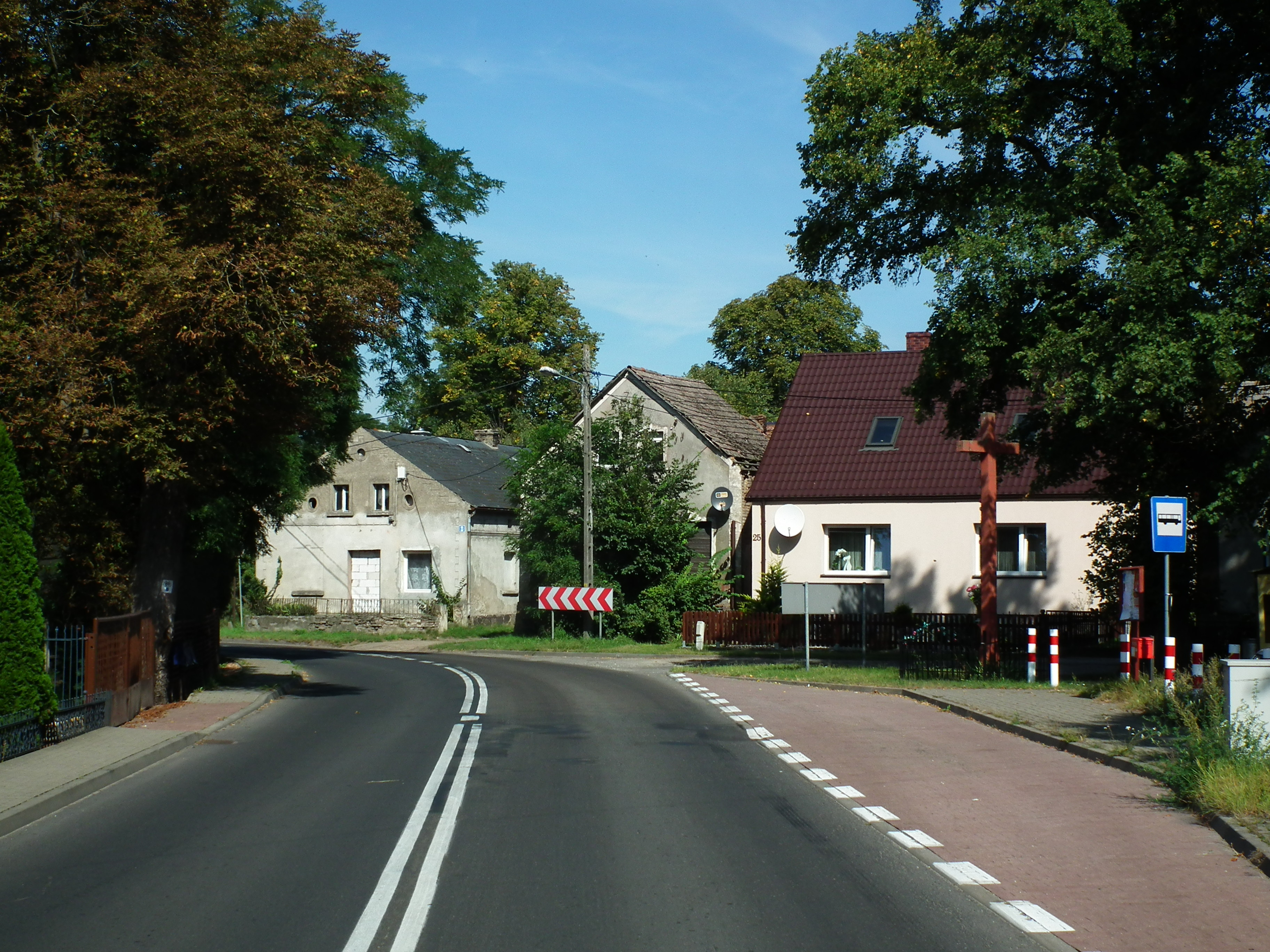

- Location within Poland
- Coordinates: 52°39′8″N 14°59′58″E
- Country: Poland
- Voivodeship: Lubusz
- County: Gorzów
- Gmina: Witnica
- Highest elevation: 30 m (98 ft)
- Lowest elevation: 15 m (49 ft)
- Population (approx.): 300

Świerkocin (Polish: [ɕfjɛrˈkɔt͡ɕin]; German: Fichtwerder) is a village in the administrative district of Gmina Witnica, within Gorzów County, Lubusz Voivodeship, in western Poland.
