= Dąbroszyn Palace =

Historical palace in Poland

Tamsel Palace
- Dąbroszyn Palace
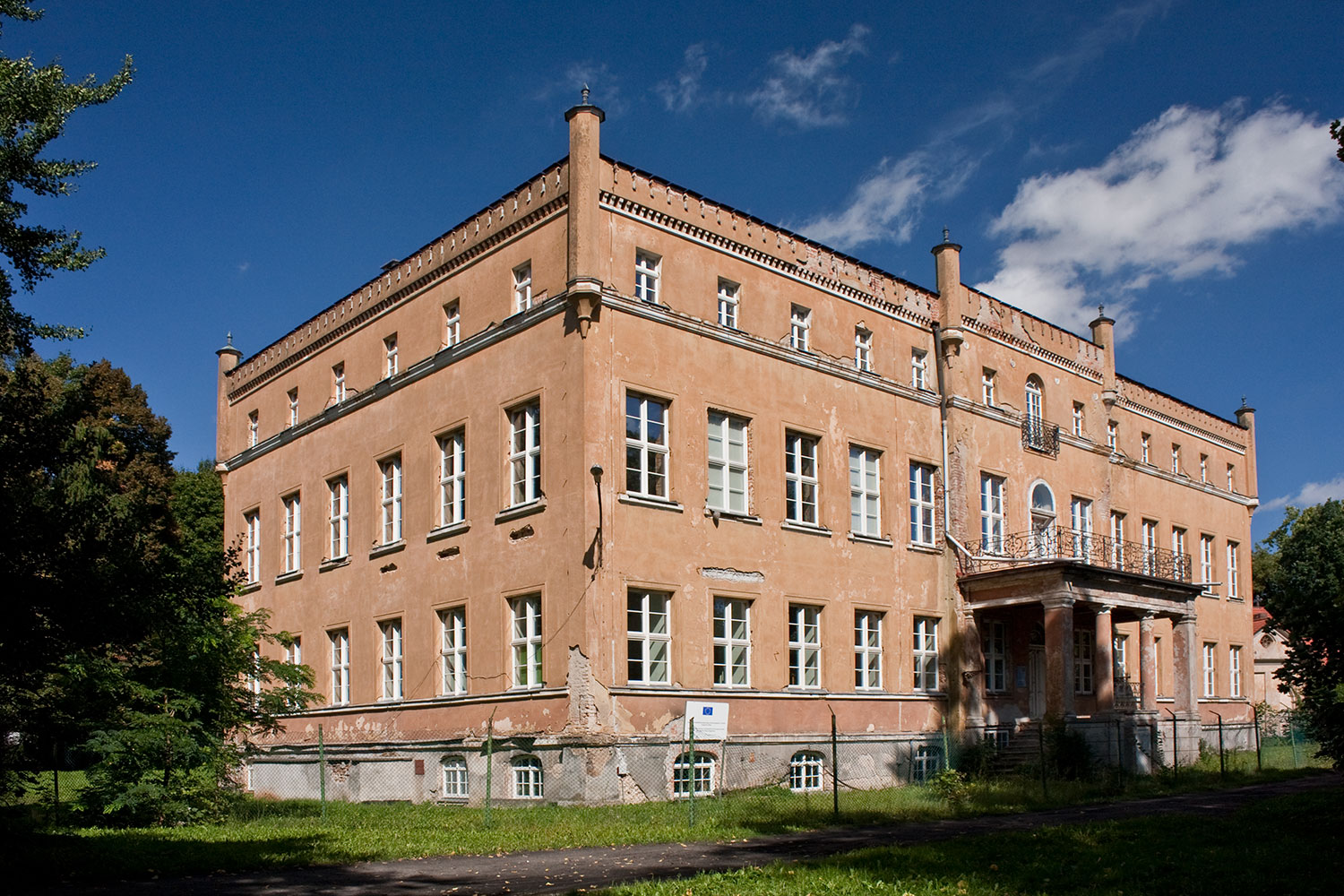

General information
- Address: Dąbroszyn, Lubusz Voivodeship, Poland
- Coordinates: 52.6206°N 14.7061°E

Tamsel Palace (or Dąbroszyn Palace) is a historical palace complex in Dąbroszyn (formerly known as Tamsel), in western Poland.

It consists of a manor house, a church and a park. It was constructed in the late 17th century by Field Marshal Hans Adam von Schöning. His granddaughter, Luise Eleonore, inherited the castle as a child of four and married Lieutenant-General von Wreech at age 16.

== Overview ==
The estate was closely associated during the 18th century with Frederick the Great. As Crown Prince, Frederick was stationed by his father in Küstrin (Kostrzyn nad Odrą), 5 km south-east of Tamsel along the Oder river. Between August 1731 and February 1732, the Prince was a guest at Tamsel, and became clearly infatuated with the 24-year-old Frau von Wreech shortly before his reluctant marriage. In his letters, the Prince referred to Tamsel as 'Calypso's island'.

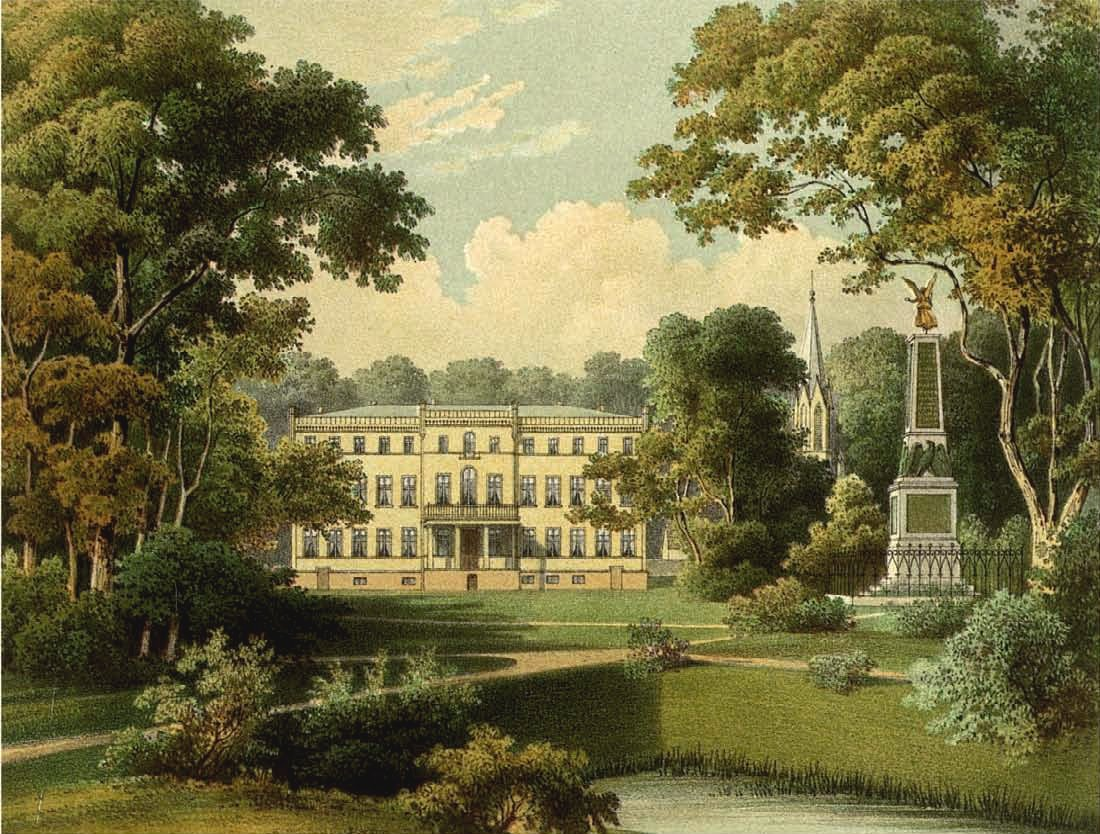
19th-century view of the palace

25 years later, after a nearby battle Battle of Zorndorf with Russian forces on 30 August 1758, King Frederick visited Tamsel once again. The estate had been looted and burned, and several children and teachers killed.

In May 1840, on the hundredth anniversary of Frederick II's accession to the throne, a statue was erected in the park to honour the King and his ties to Tamsel. The statue is a replica of Christian Daniel Rauch's "Victoria" and the pedestal is inscribed with the text of Jeremiah 3:27: "It is good for a man that he bear the yoke of his youth."

After the last of the male Wreeches died without heirs, the castle passed into the ownership of a daughter of Luise Eleonore, who married Count Doenhoff. In 1945 the castle was briefly the headquarters of the Soviet Marshal Georgy Zhukov. The estate was largely spared damage during the Second World War, and EU funding in the late 1990s has been used for its partial restoration. The building is today partially empty, with areas used for a Kindergarten and lending library.

Theodor Fontane devotes a chapter to the estate and chapel in his Walks through the March of Brandenburg, Vol II "Oderland".

Hans Bentzien's My blackbird sings in Tamsel is a small illustrated volume, providing a history of Brandenburg and Tamsel.

== Chapel ==
Chapel and palace

The estate's chapel incorporates a Hall of Fame for Schöning, with its left transept holding statues, arms, and trophies. A double niche there hosts large stone statues of Field Marshal Hans Adam von Schöning and his wife. To the left is a marble bust of their son (Johann Ludwig von Schöning, 1675–1713).

Hans Adam von Schöning's large, copper coffin is also held in the chapel. It is decorated with a golden (or silver) crucifix and the family emblem, and the walls are decorated with flags inscribed:

Der hochwohlgeborene Herr, Herr Hans Adam von Schöning auf Tamsel, Warnick, Birkholz, Churf. Sächs. wohlbestallt gewesener General-Feldmarschall, wirklich Geheimer und Geheimer Kriegsrath, Obrister der Leibgarde zu Fuß, wie auch über ein Regiment Cürassiers und ein Regiment Dragoners, ward geboren zu Tamsel den 1. Oktober 1641, starb selig zu Dresden, den 28. August 1696.

The honorable gentleman, Mr. Hans Adam von Schöning on Tamsel, Warnick, Birkholz, Churf. Saxon. comfortably installed before in the General Field Marshal, and Privy council Privy really, colonel of the Guards on foot, as well as a regiment and a regiment of dragoon Cürassiers, was born to the first Tamsel October 1641, died blessed to Dresden, 28 August 1696.

Other notable coffins are those of Wreech's wife Eleonore Luise, who died at age 60, and of her sons, Friedrich Wilhelm von Wreich and Ludwig Graf von Wreich, the last two Wreeches.
