= Kamień Wielki =

- Village
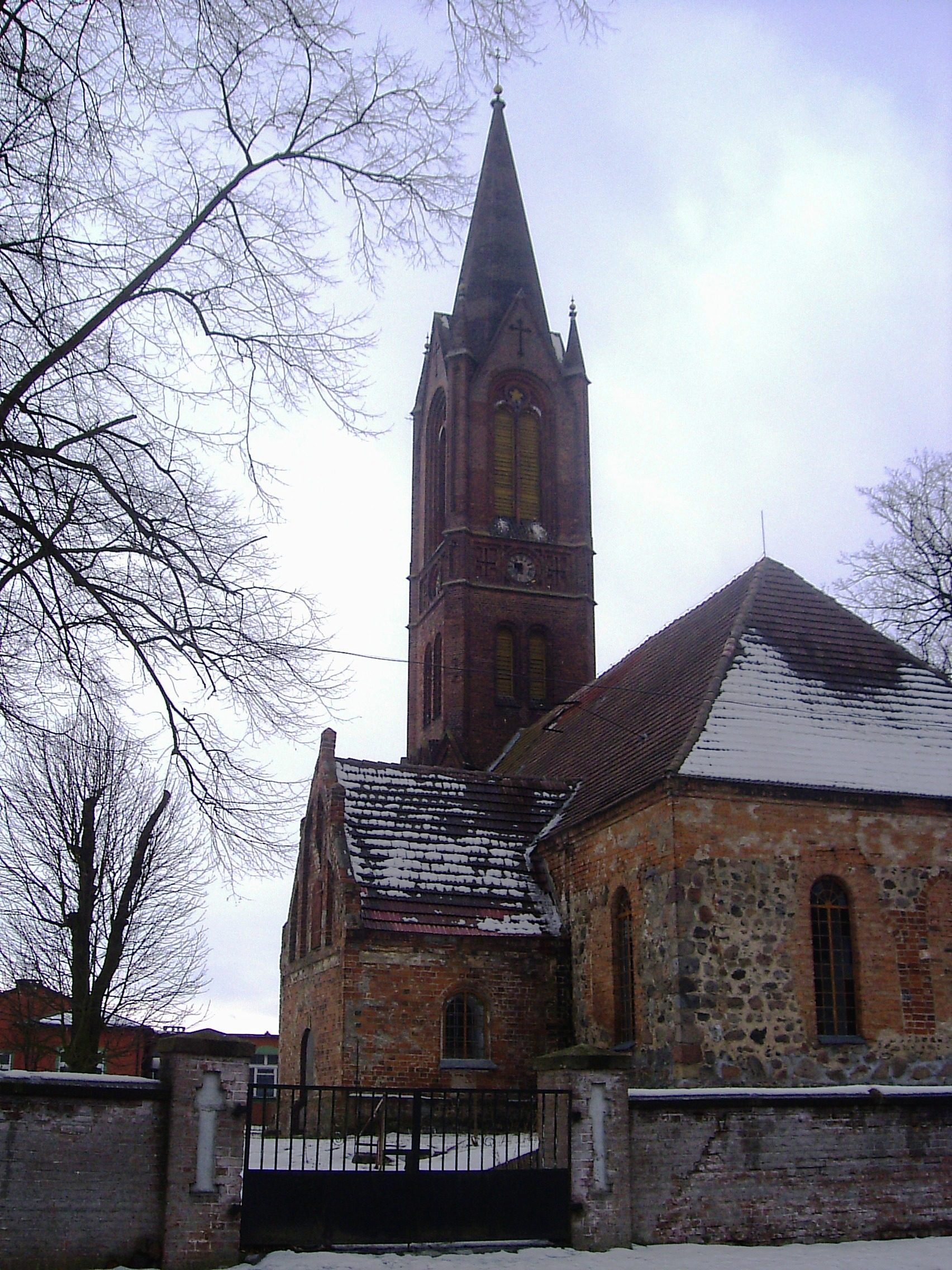

- Location within Poland
- Coordinates: 52°40′N 14°47′E
- Country: Poland
- Voivodeship: Lubusz
- County: Gorzów
- Gmina: Witnica
- Population: 780

Kamień Wielki (Polish pronunciation: [ˈkamjɛj̃ ˈvjɛlkʲi]; German: Groß Cammin) is a village in the administrative district of Gmina Witnica, within Gorzów County, Lubusz Voivodeship, in western Poland.
