= Stare Dzieduszyce =

- Village
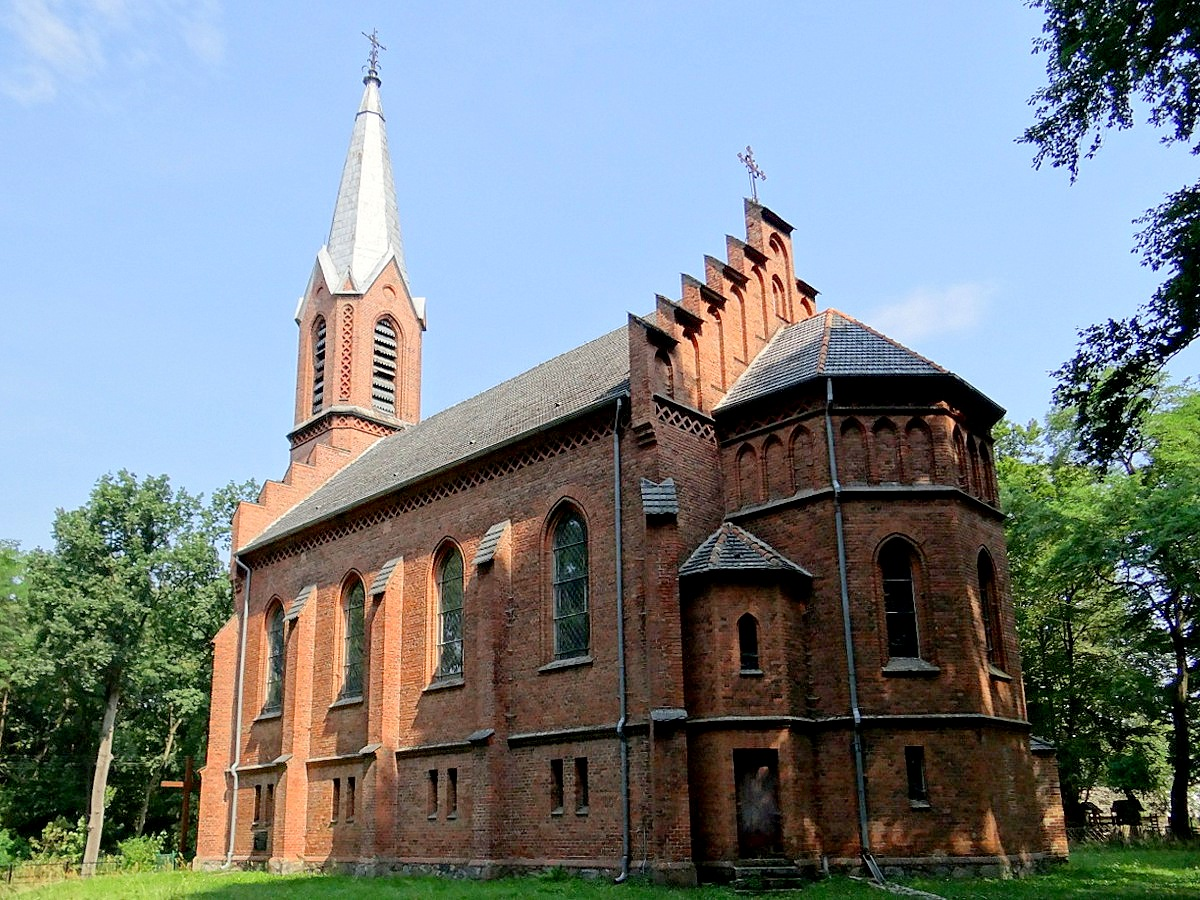
- Catholic church

- Location within Poland
- Coordinates: 52°43′26″N 14°58′14″E
- Country: Poland
- Voivodeship: Lubusz
- County: Gorzów
- Gmina: Witnica
- Population: 225

Stare Dzieduszyce ([ˈstarɛ d͡ʑɛduˈʂɨt͡sɛ]; German: Alt Diedersdorf) is a village in the administrative district of Gmina Witnica, within Gorzów County, Lubusz Voivodeship, in western Poland.
