= Mościczki =

- Village
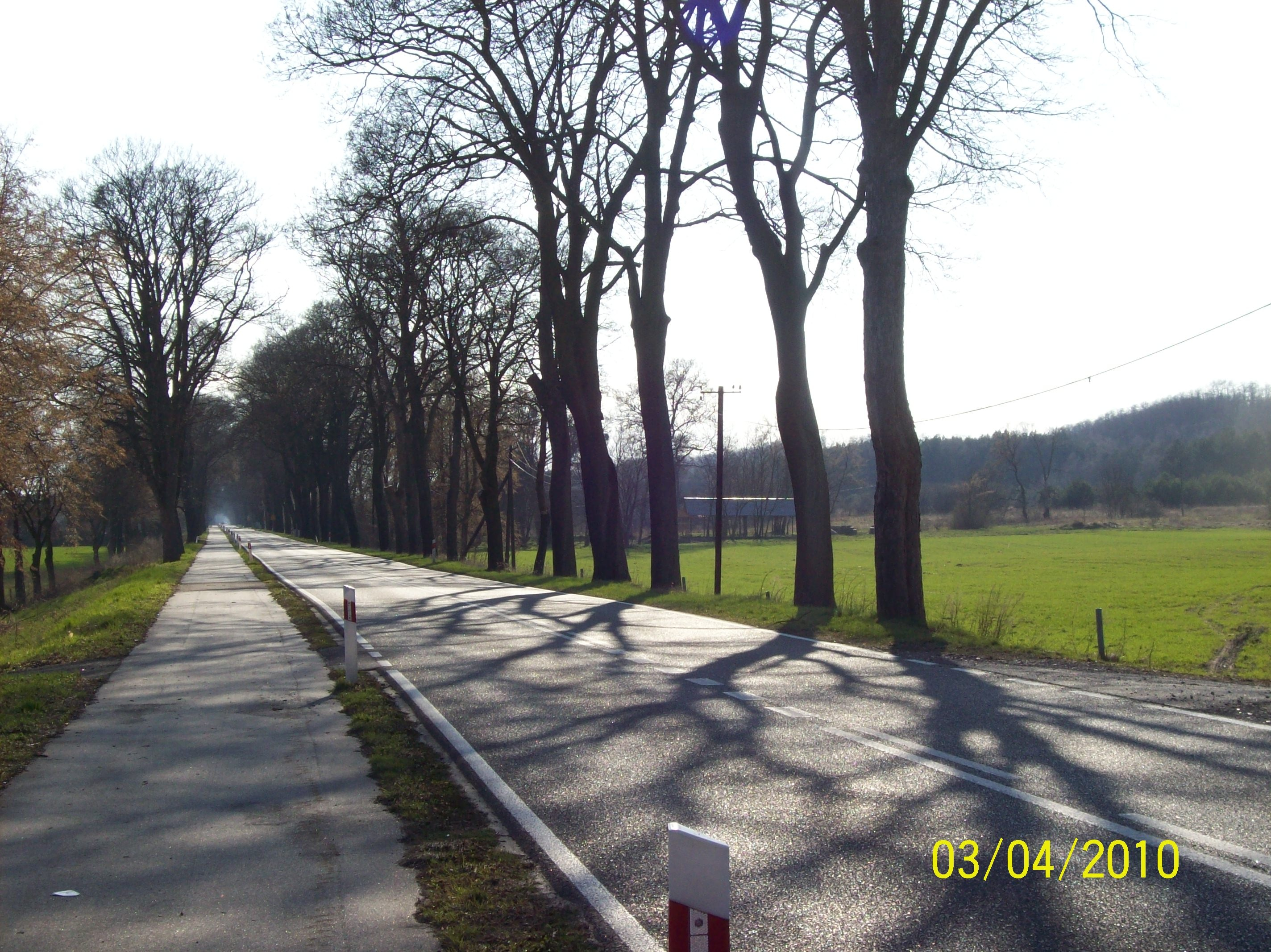

- Location within Poland
- Coordinates: 52°41′N 14°51′E
- Country: Poland
- Voivodeship: Lubusz
- County: Gorzów
- Gmina: Witnica
- Population: 250

Mościczki ([mɔɕˈt͡ɕit͡ʂki]; German: Blumbergerbruch) is a village in the administrative district of Gmina Witnica, within Gorzów County, Lubusz Voivodeship, in western Poland.
