= Nowe Dzieduszyce =

- Village
- Location within Poland
- Coordinates: 52°43′N 15°0′E
- Country: Poland
- Voivodeship: Lubusz
- County: Gorzów
- Gmina: Witnica

Nowe Dzieduszyce ([ˈnɔvɛ d͡ʑɛduˈʂɨt͡sɛ]; German: Neu Diedersdorf) is a village in the administrative district of Gmina Witnica, within Gorzów County, Lubusz Voivodeship, in western Poland.
