= Białcz, Lubusz Voivodeship =

Białcz
- Village
- Location within Poland
- Coordinates: 52°40′N 14°56′E
- Country: Poland
- Voivodeship: Lubusz
- County: Gorzów
- Gmina: Witnica
- Climate: Cfb

Białcz ([bjau̯t͡ʂ];German: Balz) is a village in the administrative district of Gmina Witnica, within Gorzów County, Lubusz Voivodeship, in western Poland.
