= Hans Albrecht von Barfus =

Prussian Field Marshal and Prime Minister

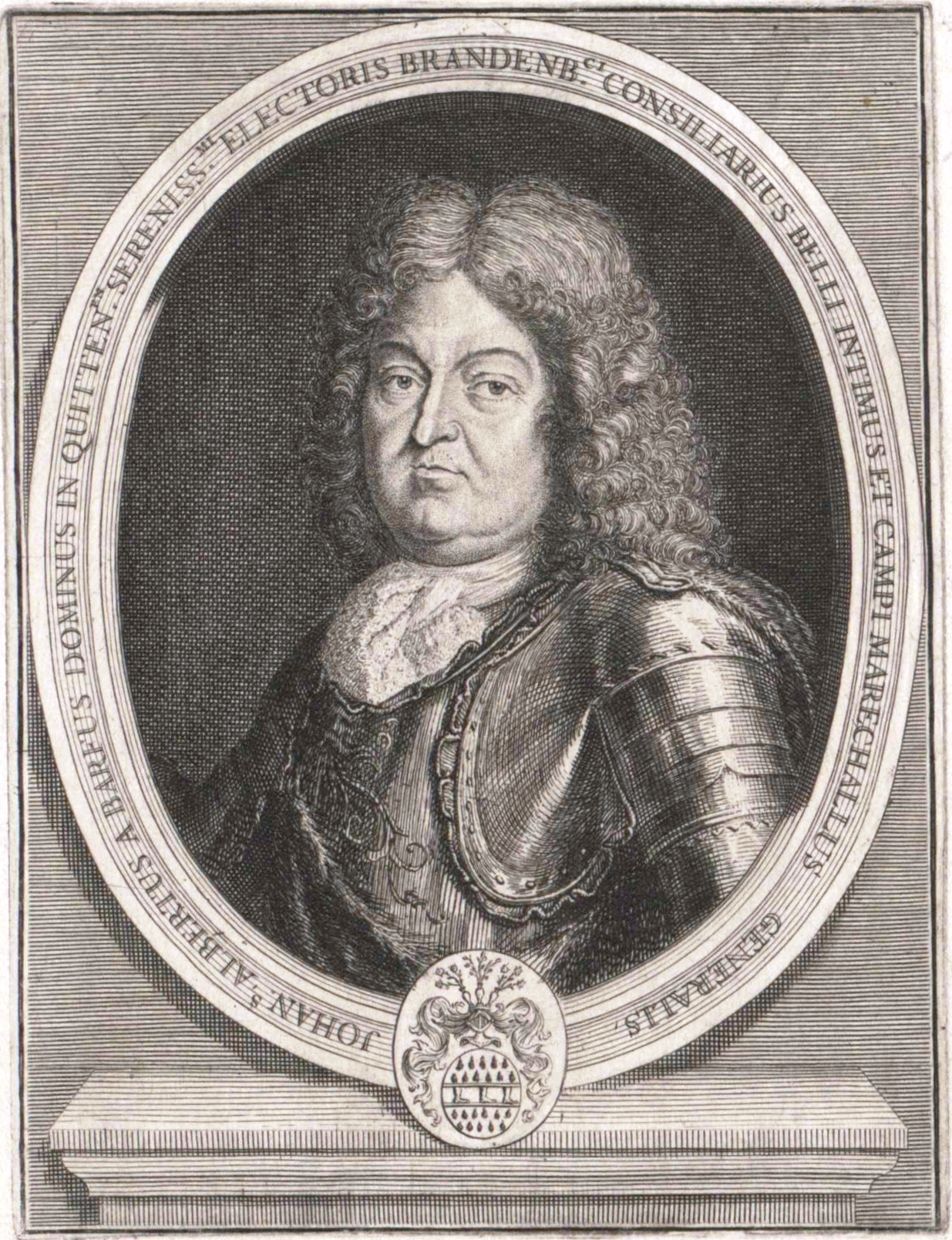
- Hans Albrecht von Barfus (copper engraving)
- Born: 1635
- Died: 27 December 1704 (aged 68–69)
- Occupations: Field marshal, prime minister
- Known for: Brief service as Brandenburg prime minister; military victories

Hans Albrecht von Barfus (1635 – 27 December 1704) was a field marshal in the service of Brandenburg and Prussia, serving briefly as prime minister under King Frederick I.

== Military career ==
Barfus was born in 1635 to a cuirassier captain and his wife. He served alongside the Swedes in 1656 during the Second Northern War (as a lieutenant), and, now serving the Elector of Brandenburg, quickly rose through the ranks, eventually being granted a colonelcy. By the time of the battle of Vienna he was a major-general, and served under King John of Poland during that campaign.

When the Elector died, Frederick III took the position. During the Nine Years War, Barfus commanded Brandenburg troops serving with the Dutch against France. In 1690, Barfus violently quarreled with a fellow Electoral officer, General von Schoning. The argument resulted in both men drawing their swords, but they were, with some difficulty, separated before either was injured. The Elector ordered the arrest of both men, and Schoning was dismissed from the army.

Despite the slight damage to his reputation caused by the incident, Barfus was given command of a Brandenburg contingent assigned to an Austrian army invading Ottoman Turk territory. Despite suffering heavy losses, the German forces defeated the Turks, and Barfus was promoted to field marshal.

== Prime minister ==
Barfus held several commands during the later part of the decade, including leading a detachment sent to secure the borders with Poland in the aftermath of the death of that nation's king. In 1699, with the fall from grace of his political ally Eberhard von Danckelmann, he was first made Governor of Berlin and then de facto prime minister, with authority over military, political, and financial affairs.

Barfus, considered to be incorruptible, enjoyed the premiership for only a brief time, as the Graf von Wartenburg rose to power later that year. However, when the Elector was crowned King of Prussia, Barfus traveled with him as the army representative. He was, also, in 1701 granted the Black Eagle, the highest Prussian military award at the time.
