= Hans Adam von Schöning =

German general (1641–1696)

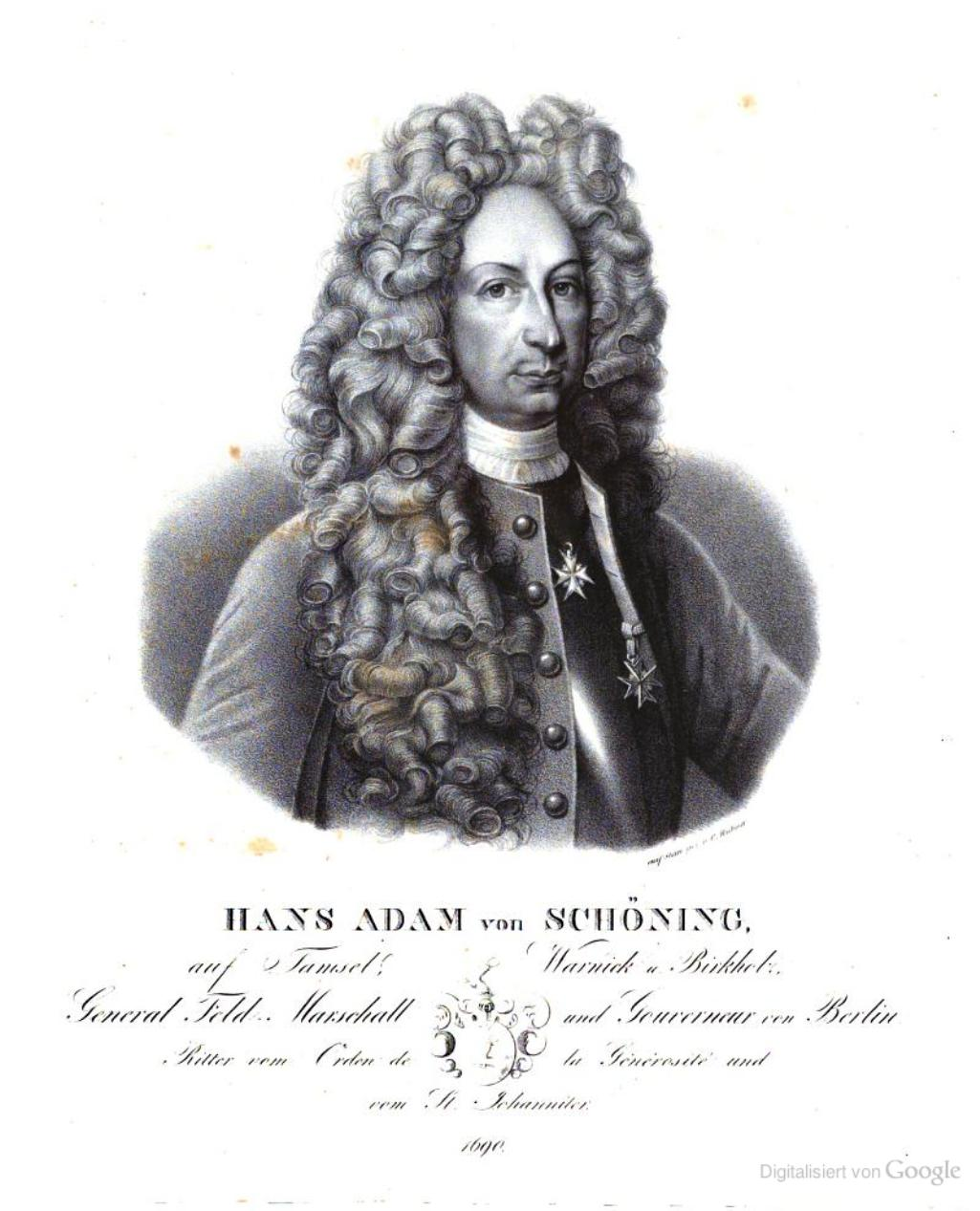
Hans Adam von Schöning

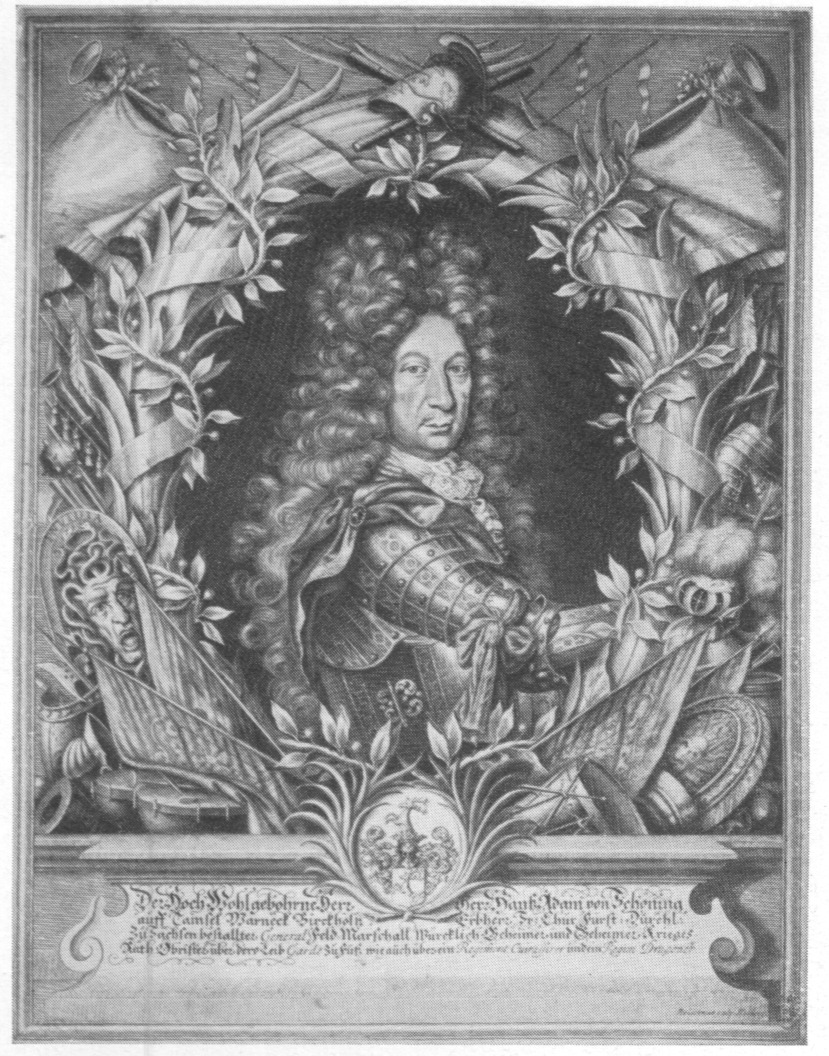
Hans Adam von Schöning, copper engraving by August Christian Fleischmann

Hans Adam von Schöning (1 October 1641 – 28 August 1696) was a Generalfeldmarschall in the service of Brandenburg-Prussia and the Electorate of Saxony.

Schöning was born at Tamsel near Küstrin in the Margraviate of Brandenburg. He was well-connected by marriage, his uncle being Field Marshal Georg von Derfflinger and his daughter being married to Colonel Ludwig von Blumenthal, a nephew of Field Marshal von Dünewald and brother-in-law of General Carl Friedrich von Schlippenbach (1658–1753). His descendants include Field Marshal von Wrangel, granddaughter Luise Eleonore Wreech (1708–1784), a nephew - the military historian Kurd von Schöning and the rocket scientist, Wernher von Braun.

Upon completing his studies at the University of Wittenberg (1657-1659) and Strasbourg University (1659/60), he traveled in Europe for several years. But upon the death of his parents, he returned to the family estate in 1664.

Von Schöning died on 28 August 1696 in Dresden and was buried in the chapel at Tamsel in Dąbroszyn. Hans Adam von Schöning was the owner of an estate in Brzoza.

== Family ==
Hans Adams parents were Hans Adam (d 1664), squire of the Knights Hospitaller, and Marianne (born in Schapelow). He married Johanna Margarethe Luise, of Pöllnitz, in 1668. He had two sons, Boguslaus, Electorate of Saxony Lieutenant Colonel, and Johann (Hans) Ludwig of Tamsel, Electorate of Saxony Chamberlain, and Lieutenant Colonel.

== Military career ==
He distinguished himself in many military campaigns, including the Turkish Wars, the Nine Years War against France, and the war against Sweden 1675-79 particularly during the conquest of Stettin, Rügen and Stralsund and in the expulsion of Sweden from Prussia. He famously quarreled with General von Barfus, and was eventually arrested for supposedly plotting to bring Saxony over to the French. Between 1677 and 1684, Schöning was regimental chef of the 1st Prussian Infantry Regiment.

In 1689 he took part in the successful Siege of Bonn.

== Schloss Tamsel ==
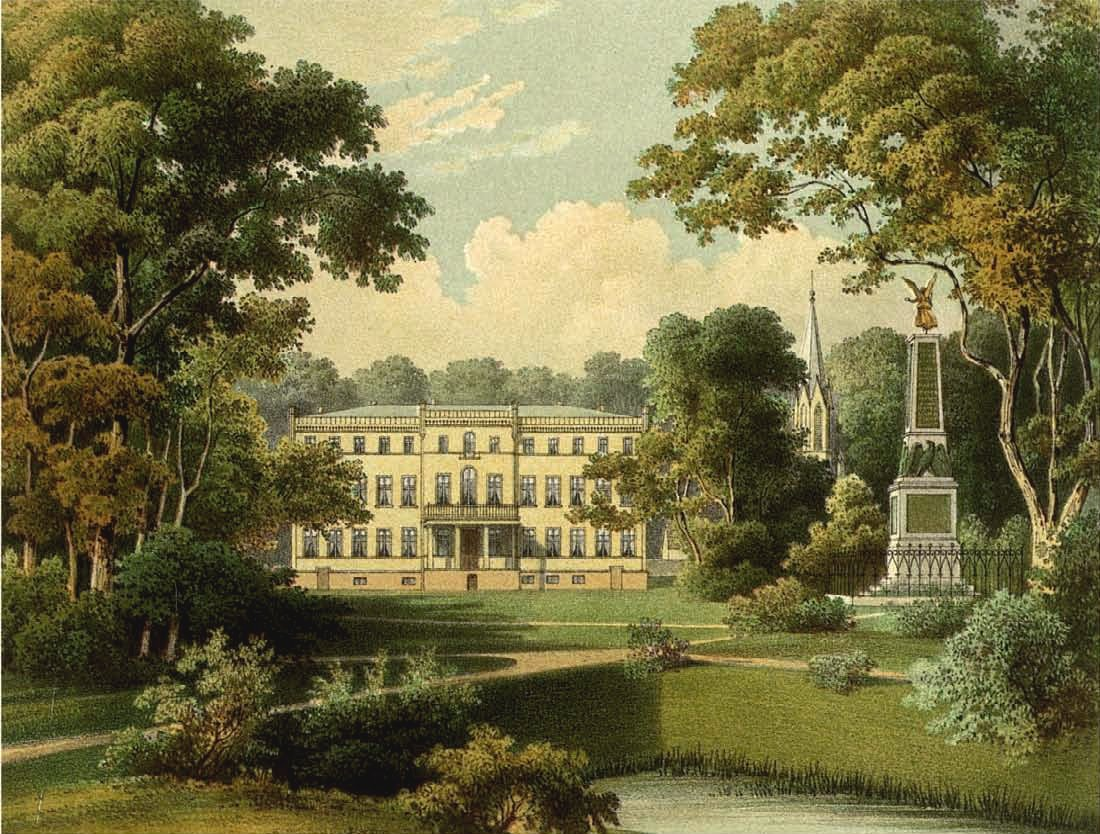
Schloss Tamsel, between 1857 and 1883

Field-Marshal von Schöning later built a castle in Tamsel, Brandenburg (now Dabroszyn/Dąbroszynie, Poland). A neo-gothic church on the estate contains a mausoleum for the von Schöning, von Wreech and von Dönhoff families.

== Biography ==
- Schöning, K. Wolfgang von. (1837), The life and wartime deeds of Field Marshal Hans Adam von Schöning on Tamsel: namely his campaign with 8,000 Brandenburgers against the Turks. A contribution to the recognition of the time conditions in the Electoral Brandenburg and Electoral Saxon lands during the second half of the 17th century. With portraits of the field marshal and 55 facsimiles of signatures of distinguished contemporaries. Lüderitz, Berlin 1837
