= Boguszyniec, Lubusz Voivodeship =

Boguszyniec
- Village
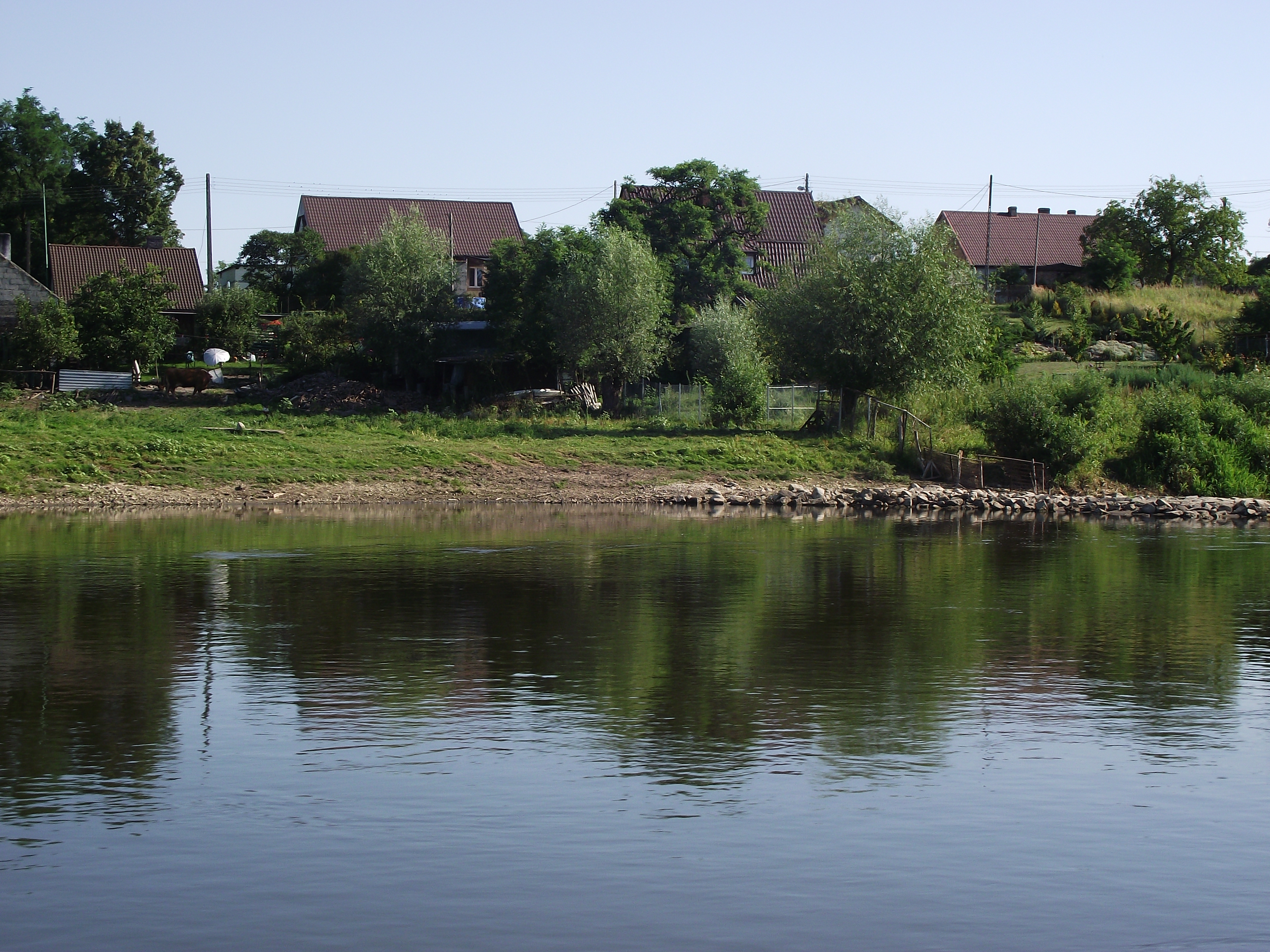

- Location within Poland
- Coordinates: 52°38′N 14°59′E
- Country: Poland
- Voivodeship: Lubusz
- County: Gorzów
- Gmina: Witnica
- Climate: Cfb

Boguszyniec ([bɔɡuˈʂɨɲɛt͡s]; German: Brückendorf) is a village in the administrative district of Gmina Witnica, within Gorzów County, Lubusz Voivodeship, in western Poland.
