= Krześniczka =

- Village
- Location within Poland
- Coordinates: 52°37′58″N 14°45′12″E
- Country: Poland
- Voivodeship: Lubusz
- County: Gorzów
- Gmina: Witnica

Krześniczka ([kʂɛɕˈnit͡ʂka]; German: Wilkersdorf) is a village in the administrative district of Gmina Witnica, within Gorzów County, Lubusz Voivodeship, in western Poland.
