= Gmina Witnica =

Gmina Witnica Witnica Commune
- Gmina
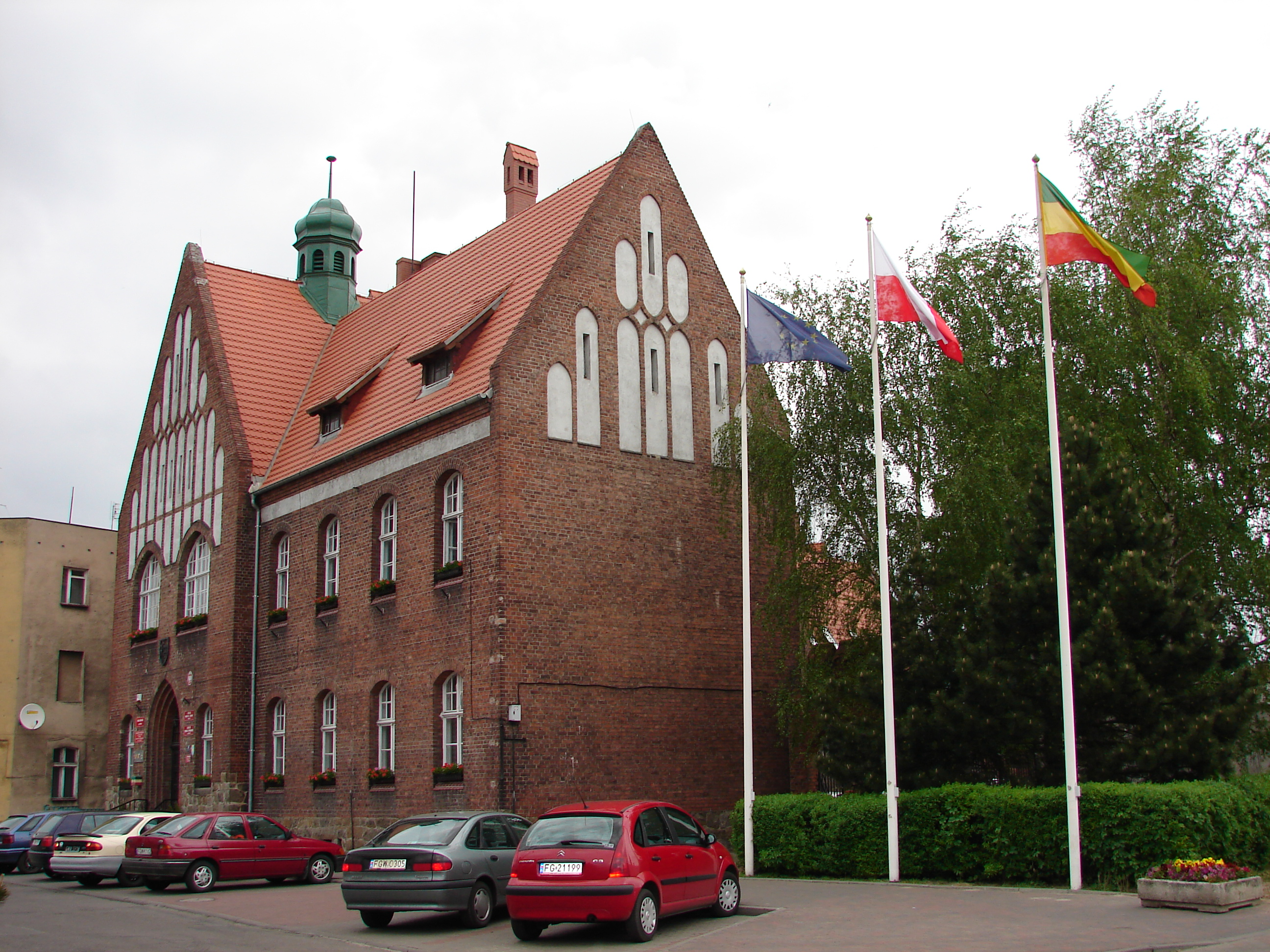

- Flag Coat of arms
- Interactive map of Gmina Witnica
- Coordinates (Witnica): 52°40′40″N 14°53′29″E
- Country: Poland
- Voivodeship: Lubusz
- County: Gorzów
- Seat: Witnica

Area
  - Total: 278.25 km^{2} (107.43 sq mi)

Population (2019-06-30)
  - Total: 12,864
  - Density: 46.232/km^{2} (119.74/sq mi)
  - Urban: 6,747
  - Rural: 6,117
- Website: http://witnica.pl

Gmina Witnica is an urban-rural gmina (administrative district) in Gorzów County, Lubusz Voivodeship, in western Poland. Its seat is the town of Witnica, which lies approximately 25 kilometres (16 mi) west of Gorzów Wielkopolski.

The gmina covers an area of 278.25 square kilometres (107.4 sq mi), and as of 2019 its total population is 12,864.

== Villages ==
Apart from the town of Witnica, Gmina Witnica contains the villages and settlements of Białcz, Białczyk, Boguszyniec, Dąbroszyn, Kamień Mały, Kamień Wielki, Kłopotowo, Krześniczka, Mościce, Mościczki, Mosina, Nowe Dzieduszyce, Nowiny Wielkie, Oksza, Pyrzany, Sosny, Stare Dzieduszyce, Świerkocin and Tarnówek.

== Neighbouring gminas ==
Gmina Witnica is bordered by the town of Kostrzyn nad Odrą and by the gminas of Bogdaniec, Krzeszyce, Lubiszyn and Słońsk.

== Twin towns – sister cities ==
Gmina Witnica is twinned with:

- Druten, Netherlands
- Müncheberg, Germany
