= Kamień Mały, Lubusz Voivodeship =

Kamień Mały
- Village
- Location within Poland
- Coordinates: 52°38′37″N 14°46′56″E
- Country: Poland
- Voivodeship: Lubusz
- County: Gorzów
- Gmina: Witnica

Population
  - Total: 364
- Time zone: UTC+1 (CET)
  - Summer (DST): UTC+2 (CEST)

Kamień Mały (Polish pronunciation: [ˈkamjɛj̃ ˈmawɨ]; German: Stolberg in der Neumark) is a village in the administrative district of Gmina Witnica, within Gorzów County, Lubusz Voivodeship, in western Poland.

During World War II, the Germans operated a forced labour subcamp of the Stalag III-C prisoner-of-war camp in the village.
