= Tarnówek, Gorzów County =

Tarnówek
- Village
- Location within Poland
- Coordinates: 52°44′42″N 14°57′36″E
- Country: Poland
- Voivodeship: Lubusz
- County: Gorzów
- Gmina: Witnica
- Population: 10

Tarnówek [tarˈnuvɛk] is a village in the administrative district of Gmina Witnica, within Gorzów County, Lubusz Voivodeship, in western Poland.
