= Mościce, Lubusz Voivodeship =

Mościce
- Village
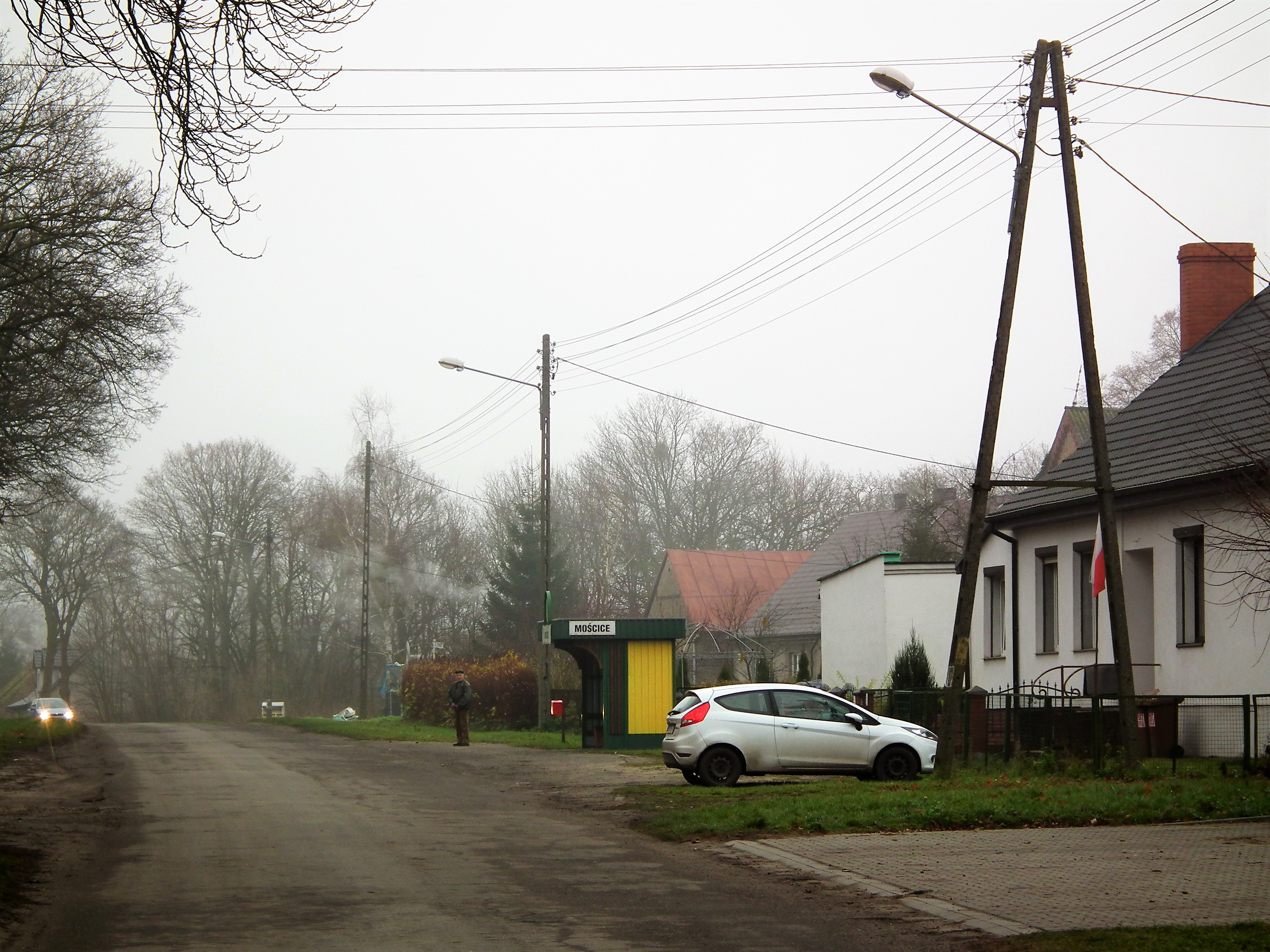

- Location within Poland
- Coordinates: 52°40′29″N 14°48′15″E
- Country: Poland
- Voivodeship: Lubusz
- County: Gorzów
- Gmina: Witnica

Mościce ([mɔɕˈt͡ɕit͡sɛ]; German: Blumberg) is a village in the administrative district of Gmina Witnica, within Gorzów County, Lubusz Voivodeship, in western Poland.
