= Luise Eleonore Wreech =

Prussian aristocrat (1708-1784)

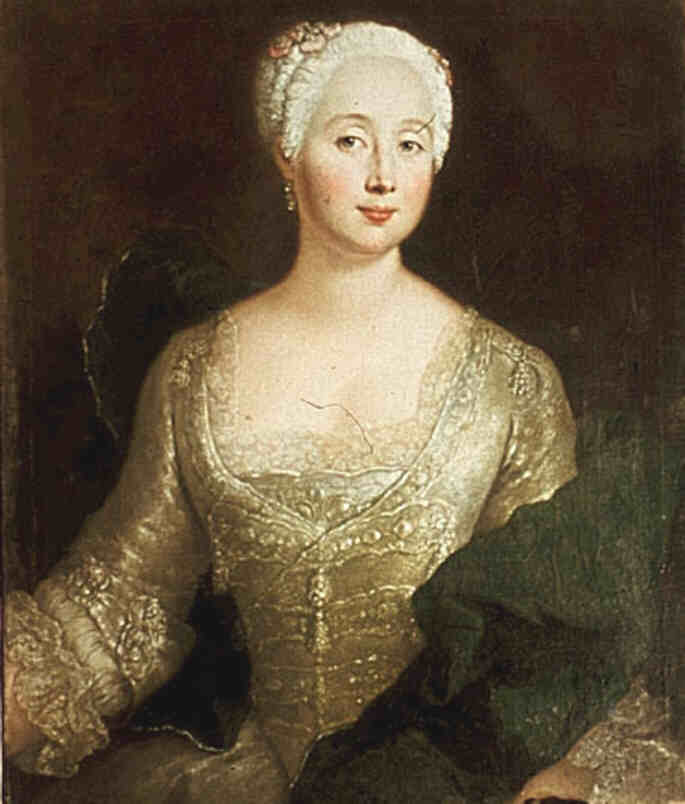
Louise Eleonore von Wreech née. von Schöning (1707–1784), in a painting by Antoine Pesne in 1737

Luise Eleonore von Wreech (1708 in Tamsel – 1784 in Berlin) was a Prussian noblewoman. Born Luise Eleonore von Schöning, she was the daughter of Johann (Hans) Ludwig Schöning and granddaughter of Hans Adam von Schöning and heiress of Castle Tamsel. She was the wife of Colonel Adam Friedrich von Wreech. The couple had two daughters, Sophie Friederike and Julie Marie Luise.

She became a close friend of Crown Prince Frederick when he stayed at Tamsel between August 1731 and February 1732. She was described by the Crown Prince as having a "complexion like roses and lilies." and he wrote several poems to her.

In 1737, her portrait was painted by the Prussian court artist Antoine Pesne. Today this portrait hangs in Princess Wilhelmine's summer residence at Altes Schloss Hermitage in the music room, Bayreuth, Germany.
