= Mosina, Lubusz Voivodeship =

Mosina
- Village
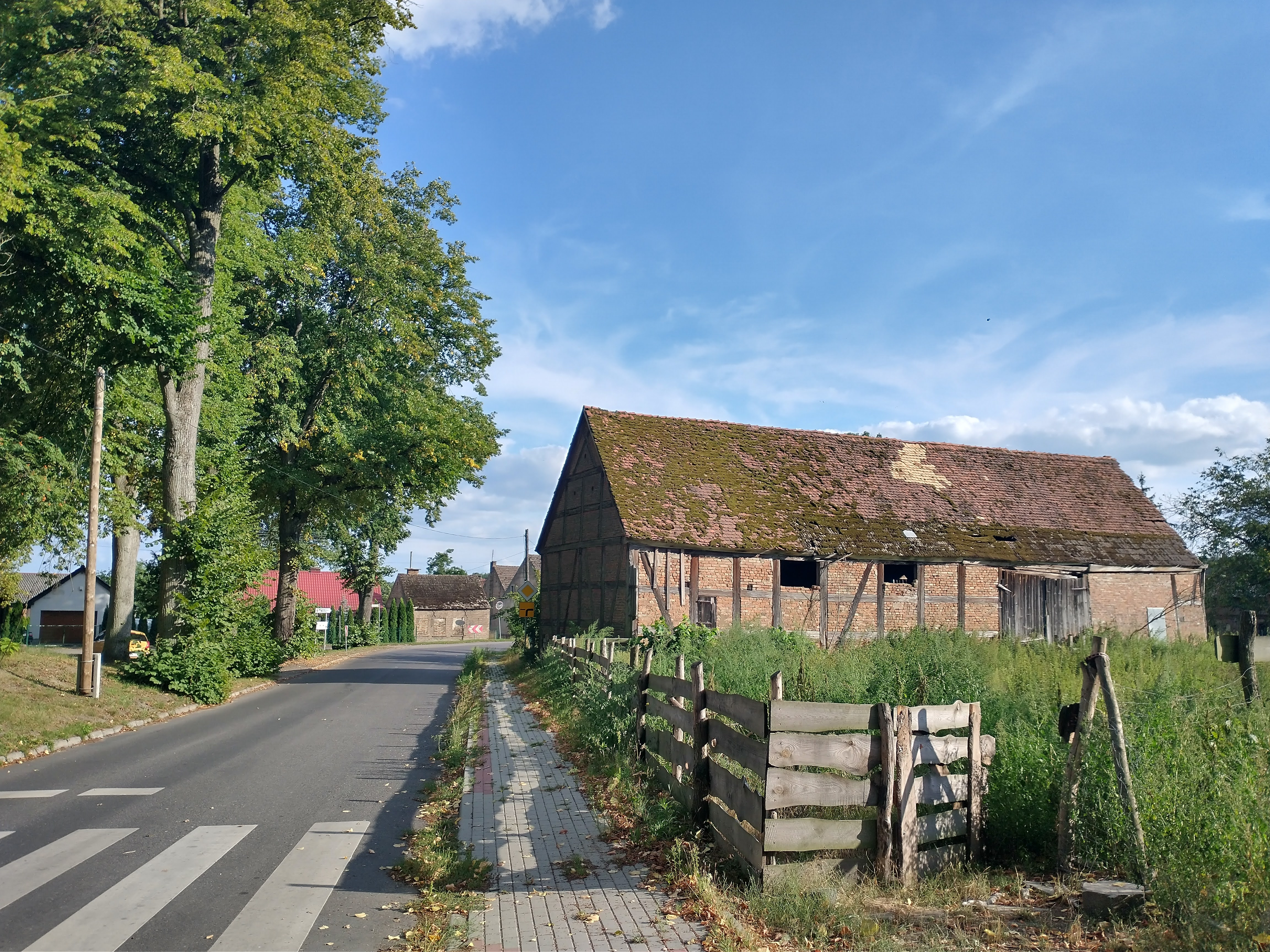

- Location within Poland
- Coordinates: 52°43′N 14°53′E
- Country: Poland
- Voivodeship: Lubusz
- County: Gorzów
- Gmina: Witnica
- Population: 300

Mosina ([mɔˈɕina]; German: Massin) is a village in the administrative district of Gmina Witnica, within Gorzów County, Lubusz Voivodeship, in western Poland.
