= Oksza, Lubusz Voivodeship =

Oksza
- Village
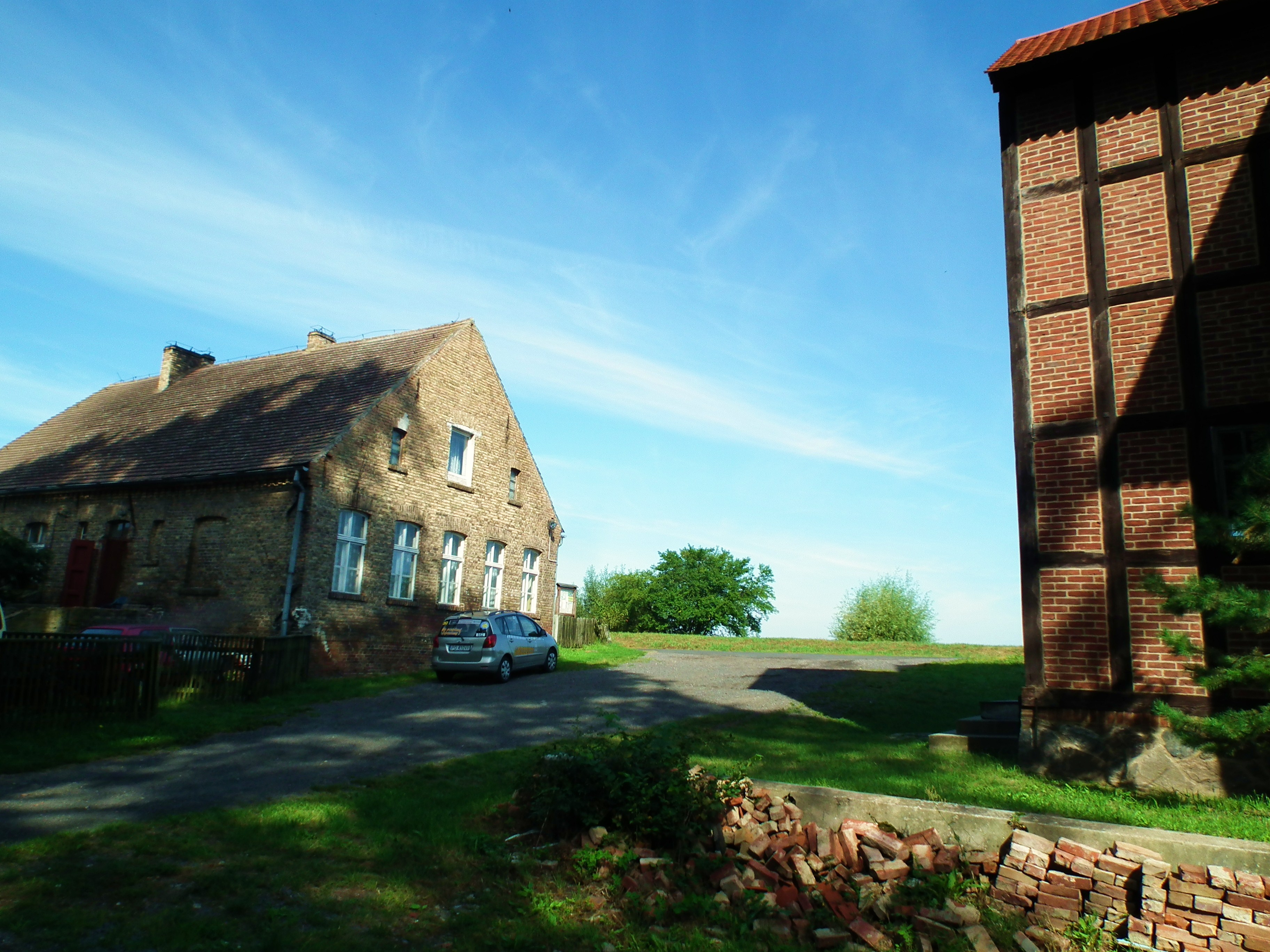
- School in Oksza

- Location within Poland
- Coordinates: 52°37′57″N 14°56′08″E
- Country: Poland
- Voivodeship: Lubusz
- County: Gorzów
- Gmina: Witnica

Oksza ([ˈɔkʂa]; German: Woxholländer) is a village in the administrative district of Gmina Witnica, within Gorzów County, Lubusz Voivodeship, in western Poland.

== See also ==
- Territorial changes of Poland after World War II
