= Bad Iburg =

- Town
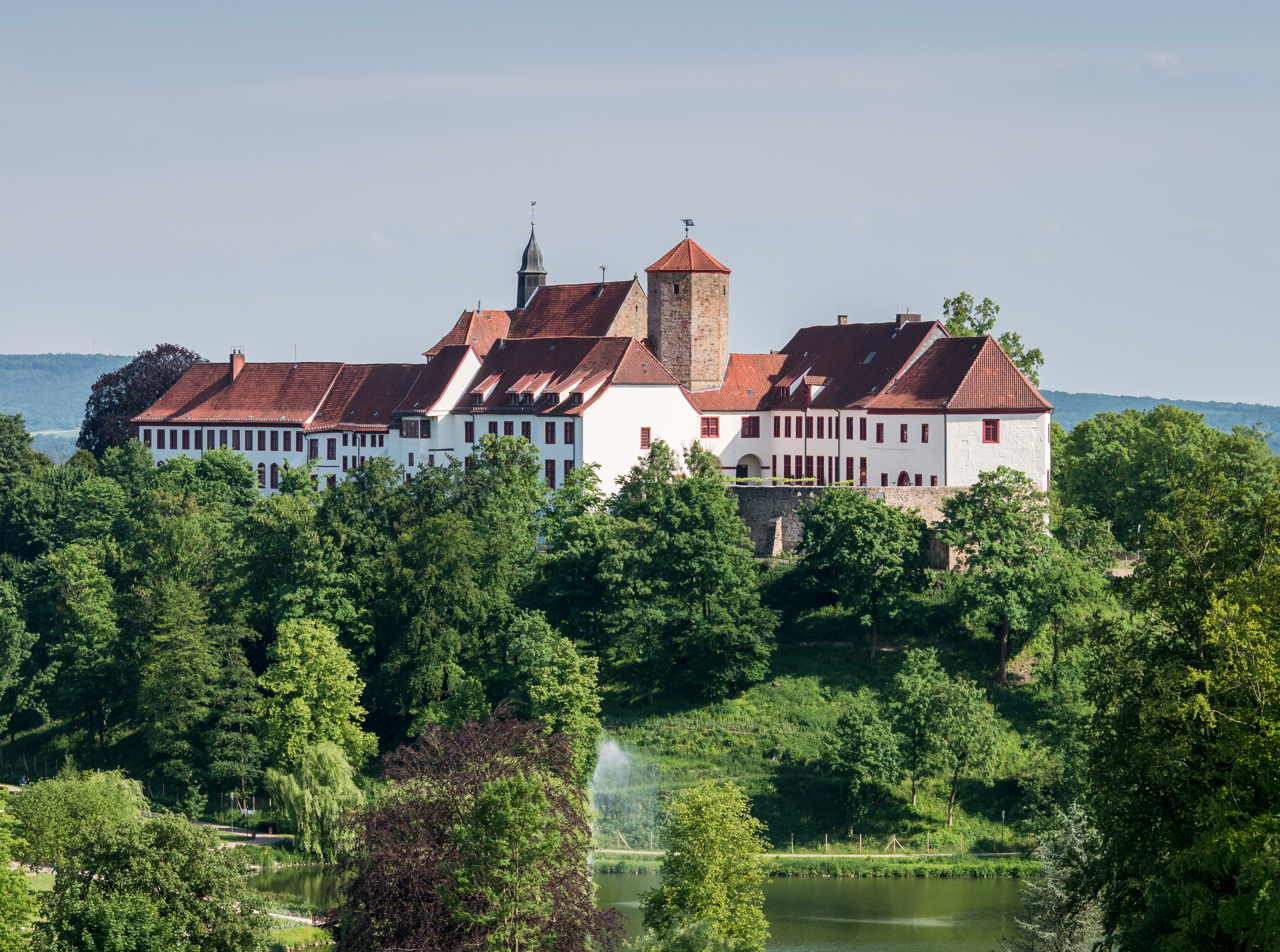
- Castle and Bennoturm

- Coat of arms

- Location of Bad Iburg within Osnabrück district
- Interactive map of Bad Iburg
- Location within Germany Location within Lower Saxony
- Coordinates: 52°09′33″N 08°02′50″E
- Country: Germany
- State: Lower Saxony
- District: Osnabrück
- Subdivisions: 4 districts

Government
  - Mayor (2021–26): Daniel Große-Albers

Area
  - Total: 36.5 km^{2} (14.1 sq mi)
- Elevation: 104 m (341 ft)

Population (2025-12-31)
  - Total: 10,610
  - Density: 291/km^{2} (753/sq mi)
- Time zone: UTC+01:00 (CET)
  - Summer (DST): UTC+02:00 (CEST)
- Postal codes: 49186
- Dialling codes: 05403
- Vehicle registration: OS, BSB, MEL, WTL
- Website: www.badiburg.de

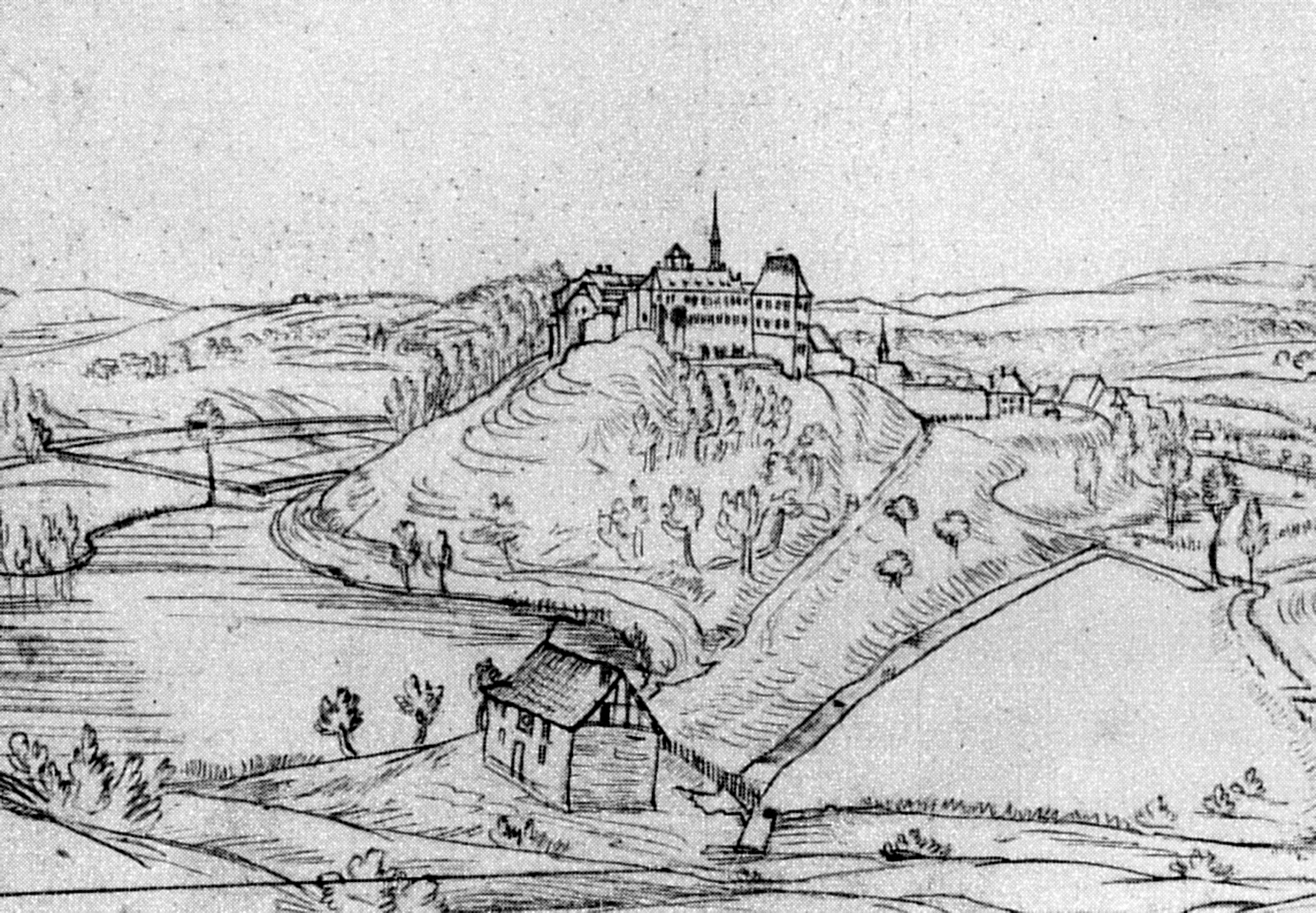
Castle and monastery Iburg before 1752, painting of Renier Roidkin

Bad Iburg (German: [baːt ˈʔiːbʊʁk]; Westphalian: Bad Ibig) is a spa town in the district of Osnabrück, in Lower Saxony, Germany. It is situated in the Teutoburg Forest, 16 km south of Osnabrück, and the Hermannsweg long-distance hiking trail passes through it.

Bad Iburg is also the name of a municipality which includes the town and four outlying centres: Glane, Ostenfelde, Sentrup and Visbeck.

The most important building is Schloss Iburg above the town. It is a complex of a castle which was the residence of the bishops of Osnabrück for six hundred years and a former monastery of the Order of Saint Benedict.

== History ==
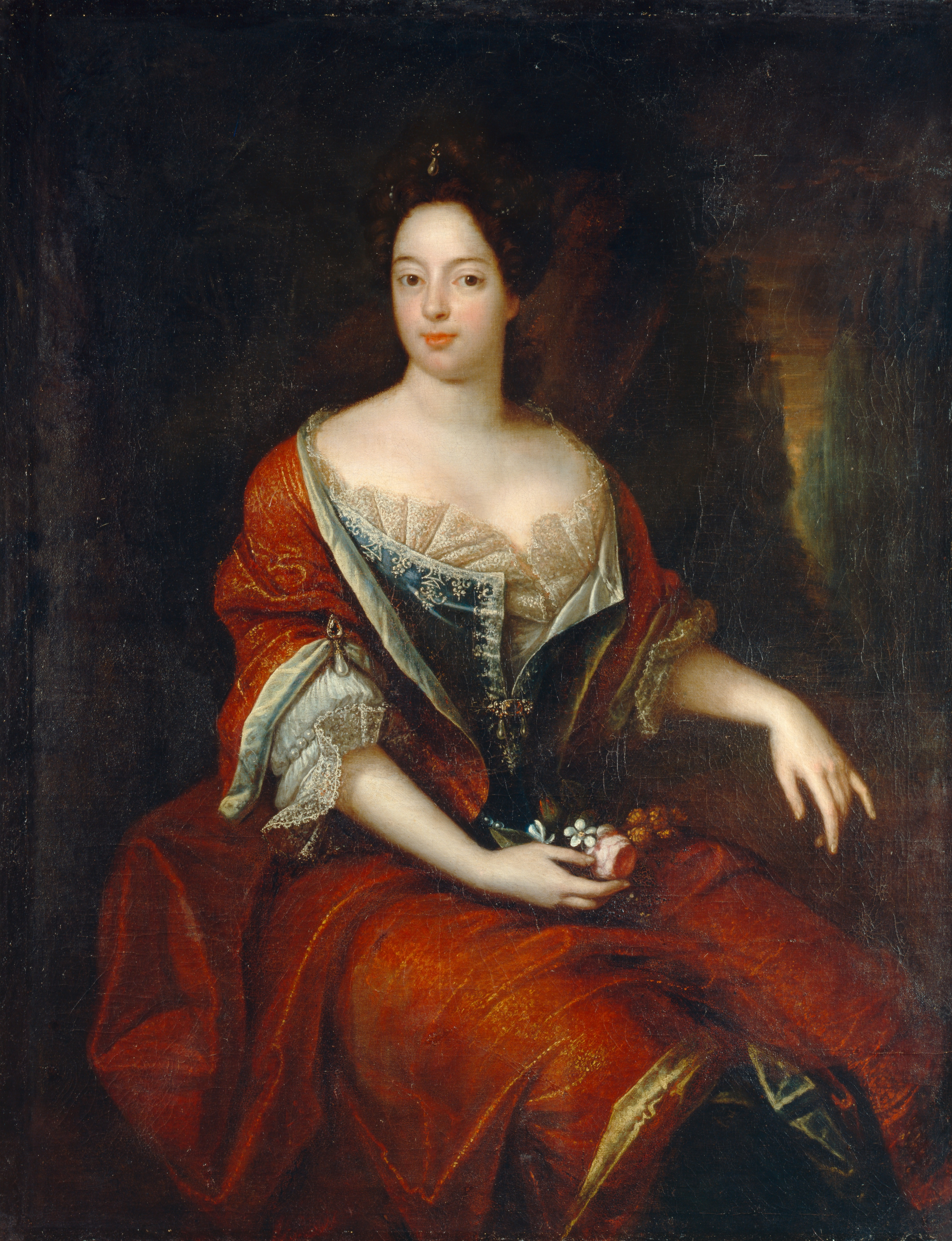
Sophia Charlotte, first Queen of Prussia, was born in Iburg castle

Bad Iburg was first mentioned in 753 in a Frankish document. In 772 the Frankish King Charlemagne captured the "Royal castle Iburg", from his chief antagonist, the Saxon leader Widukind. In a lasting period of struggles the ownership changed between Franks and Saxons. Frankish troops finally regained the castle in 783.

Bad Iburg became of more than local importance in the 11th century when Bishop Benno I (1052–1067) built a new castle on the ruins of the first fortification. This castle was also ruined so Benno I's successor Bishop Benno II of Osnabrück (1068–1088) built another castle. He also founded a Benedictine monastery, the first twelve monks came from Mainz. An interesting feature of the Roman Catholic Church of St. Clemens is the hagioscope, which allowed lepers to view the service from outside. Bishop Benno II was buried in St. Clemens, the monastery's church.

About 1100, after a large fire in Osnabrück, the castle became the residence of Osnabrück's bishops. This period ended when Ernest Augustus, Elector of Hanover & Duke of Brunswick-Lüneburg and Protestant Prince-Bishop of Osnabrück built a baroque castle in Osnabrück to which he and his family moved in 1673. He added the small Protestant church Evangelisch-lutherische Schlosskirche to the Iburg castle, thus the complex of castle and monastery has had two churches, Protestant and Catholic, since the 17th century. In 1668 Sophia Charlotte of Hanover, the only daughter of Ernest Augustus and his wife Sophia of the Palatinate, was born in Schloss Iburg. She became the first Queen of Prussia. Of special importance is the castle's Rittersaal (hall of knights). The ceiling in pseudo-architecture was painted by Andrea Alovisii.

The monastery site has a baroque building designed by Johann Conrad Schlaun in Abbot Adolph Hane's (1706–1768) time. The monastery was active until 1803 when it was secularisated by the Reichsdeputationshauptschluss.

In 1534 Bad Iburg was involved in the Münster Rebellion when six Anabaptists were captured on their way from Münster to Osnabrück and imprisoned in the octagonal tower of the castle called the Bennoturm (Benno's Tower). Five of them died during torture or were executed; the sixth was set free after betraying the plans of John of Leiden, the leader of the Anabaptists.

In 1910 the crash of the zeppelin LZ7 Deutschland near Bad Iburg brought international attention. The airship had had its maiden voyage on 19 June 1910, and nine days later was on a pleasure trip to popularize the zeppelin. On board were 19 journalists, among them two reporters of well-known British newspapers. In bad weather, the crew decided to go to Osnabrück, passing over the Teutoburg Forest. The airship crashed into Mount Limberg on 28 June 1910, just after 5 p.m. Nobody was injured. A monument with a portrait of Count Ferdinand von Zeppelin was erected on Mount Limberg after the crash, the inscription reads, Trotzdem vorwärts (Ahead nevertheless).

On 18 January 1962 an aeroplane from the British Royal Air Force crashed on the hill of the Dörenberg. The two pilots aged 24 and 26 years old, died. There is a monument at the Dörenberg in memory of the accident.

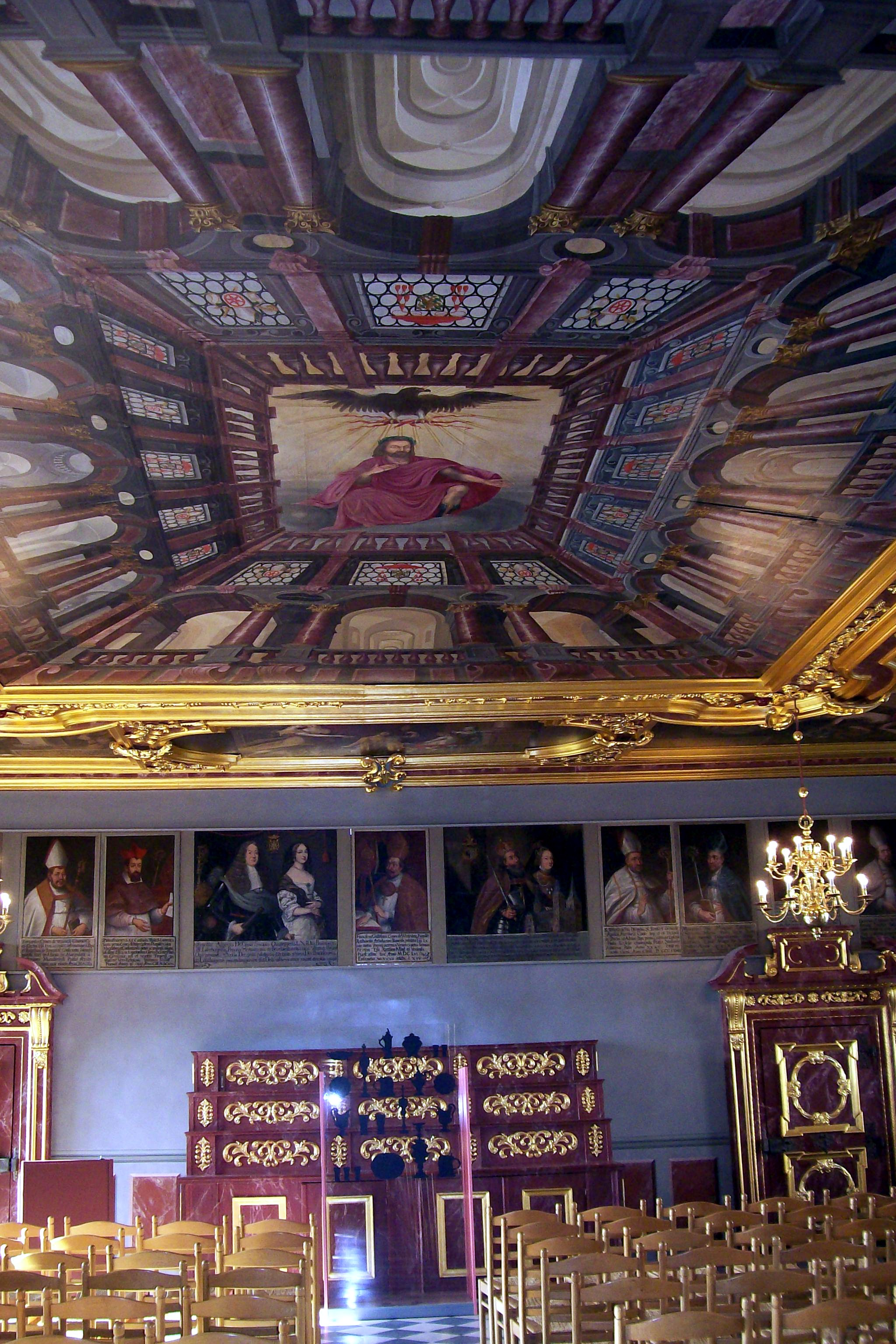
The castle's Rittersaal (hall of knights), paintings by Andrea Alovisii

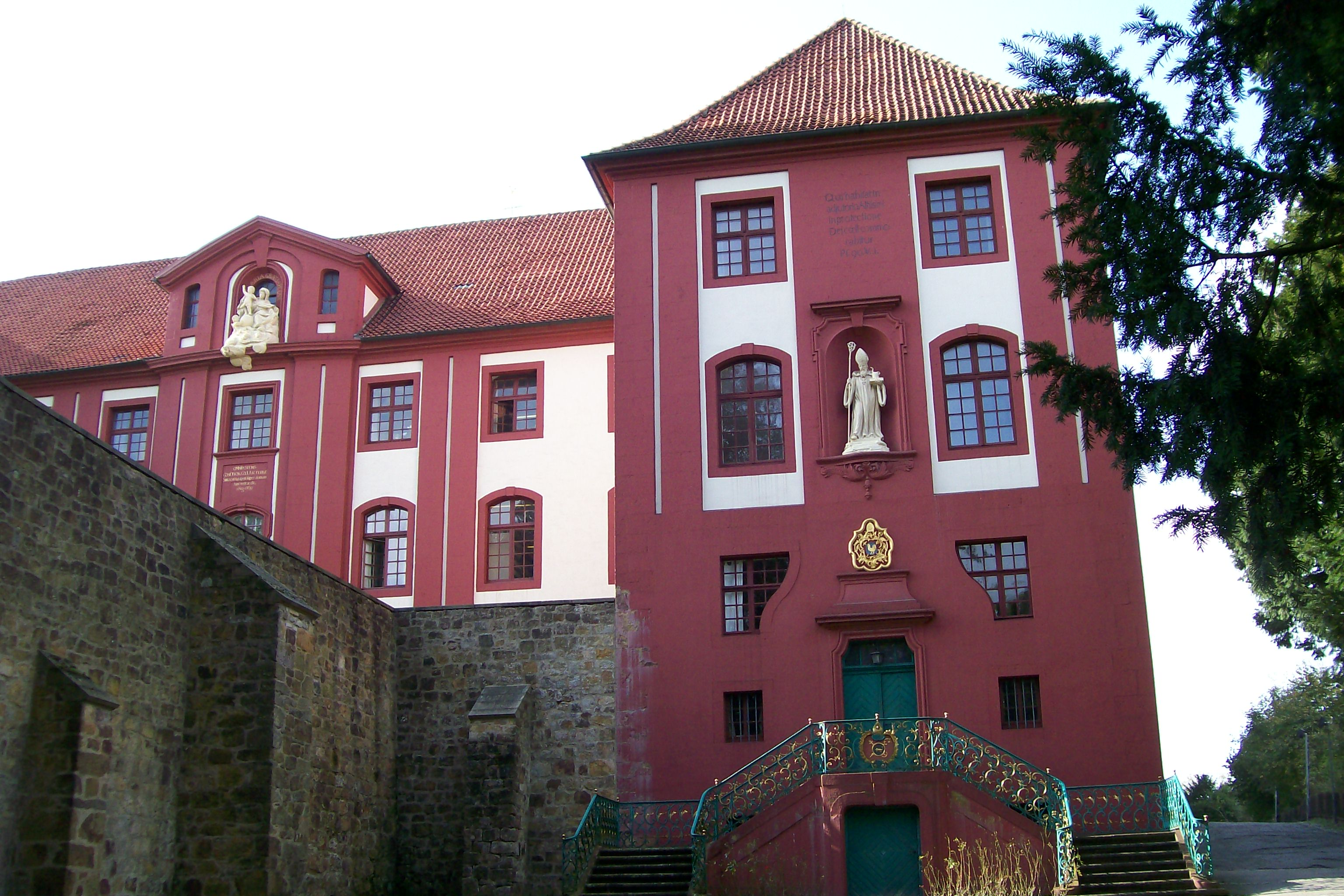
Baroque monastery designed by Johann Conrad Schlaun

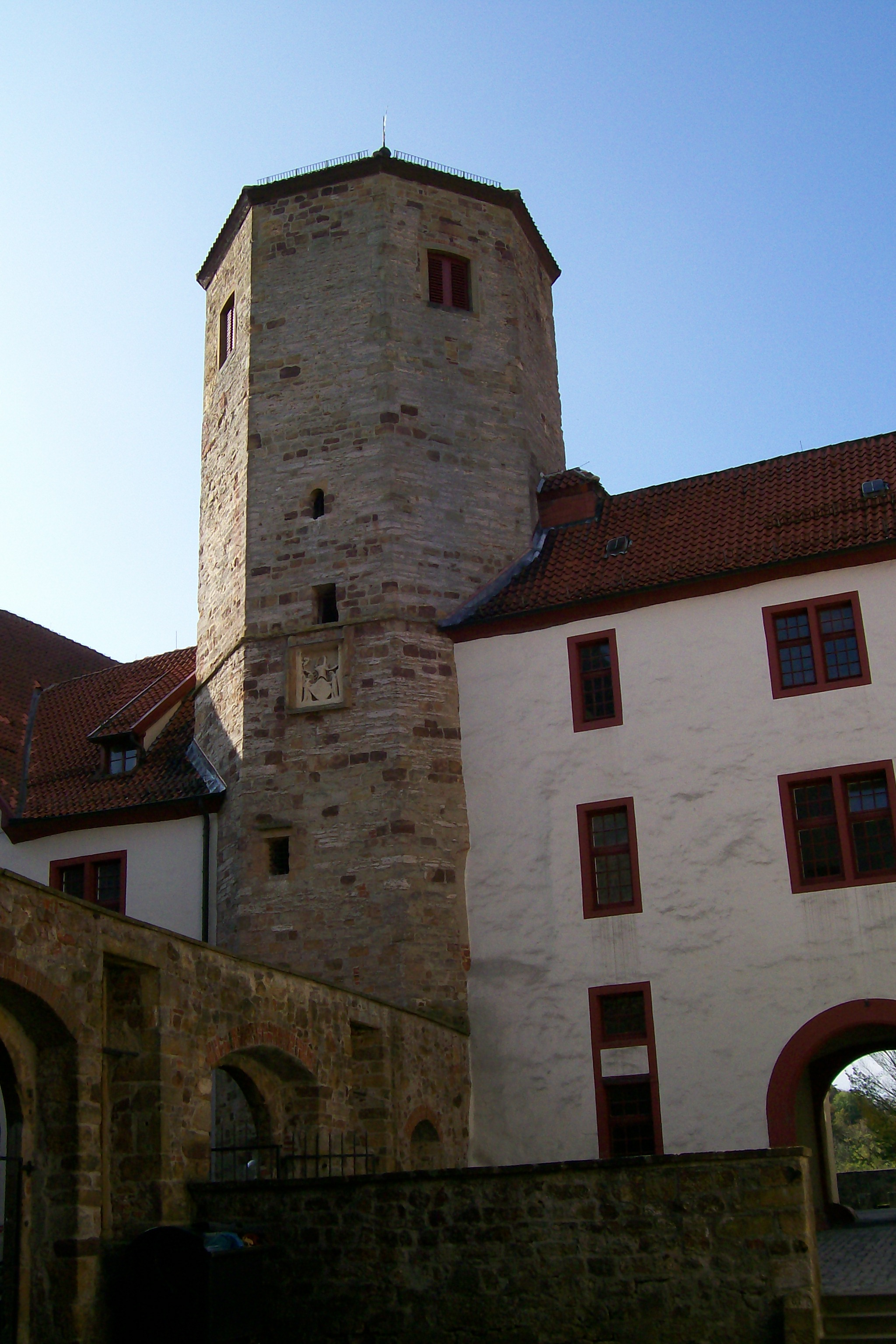
Bennoturm at the castle where anabaptists were imprisoned

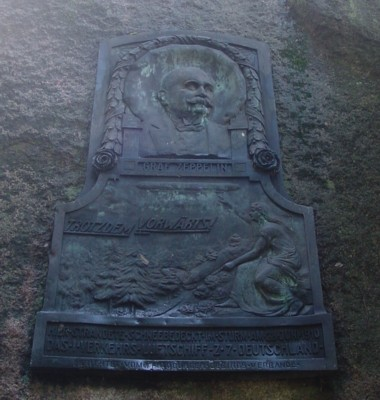
Monument on Mount Limberg commemorating the crash of LZ7

== Mayors ==
The current mayor is Daniel Große-Albers (independent), elected in 2021. He succeeded Annette Niermann (Alliance 90/The Greens), who was elected mayor in 2014. She was the successor of Drago Jurak.

== Museums ==
Bad Iburg has three museums, Schlossmuseum mit Münzkabinett, the castle museum, which includes a numismatic department, the Uhrenmuseum (a clock museum), and Averbecks Speicher, a museum of local history in a former farm's storehouse in Glane.

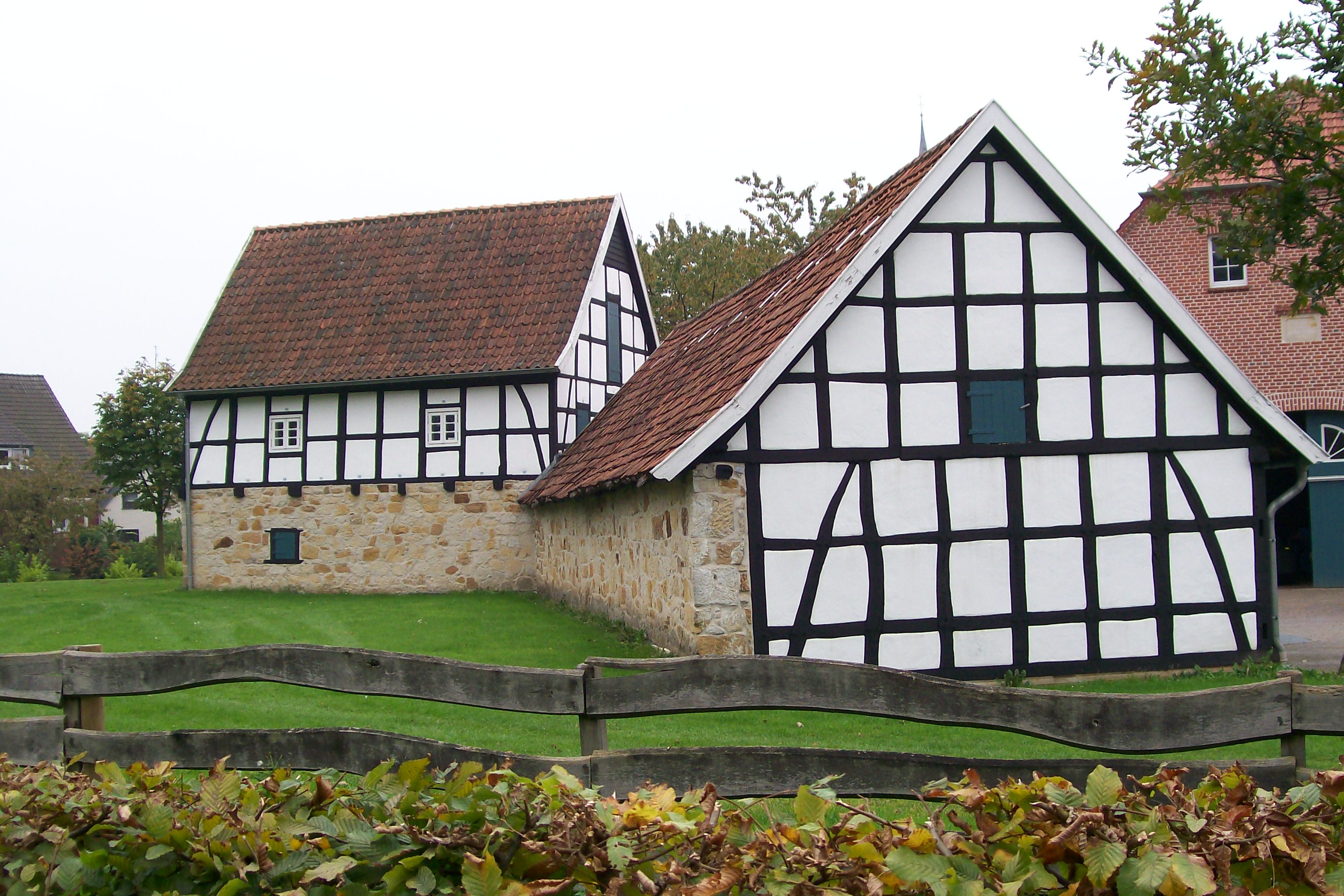
Museum Averbecks Speicher

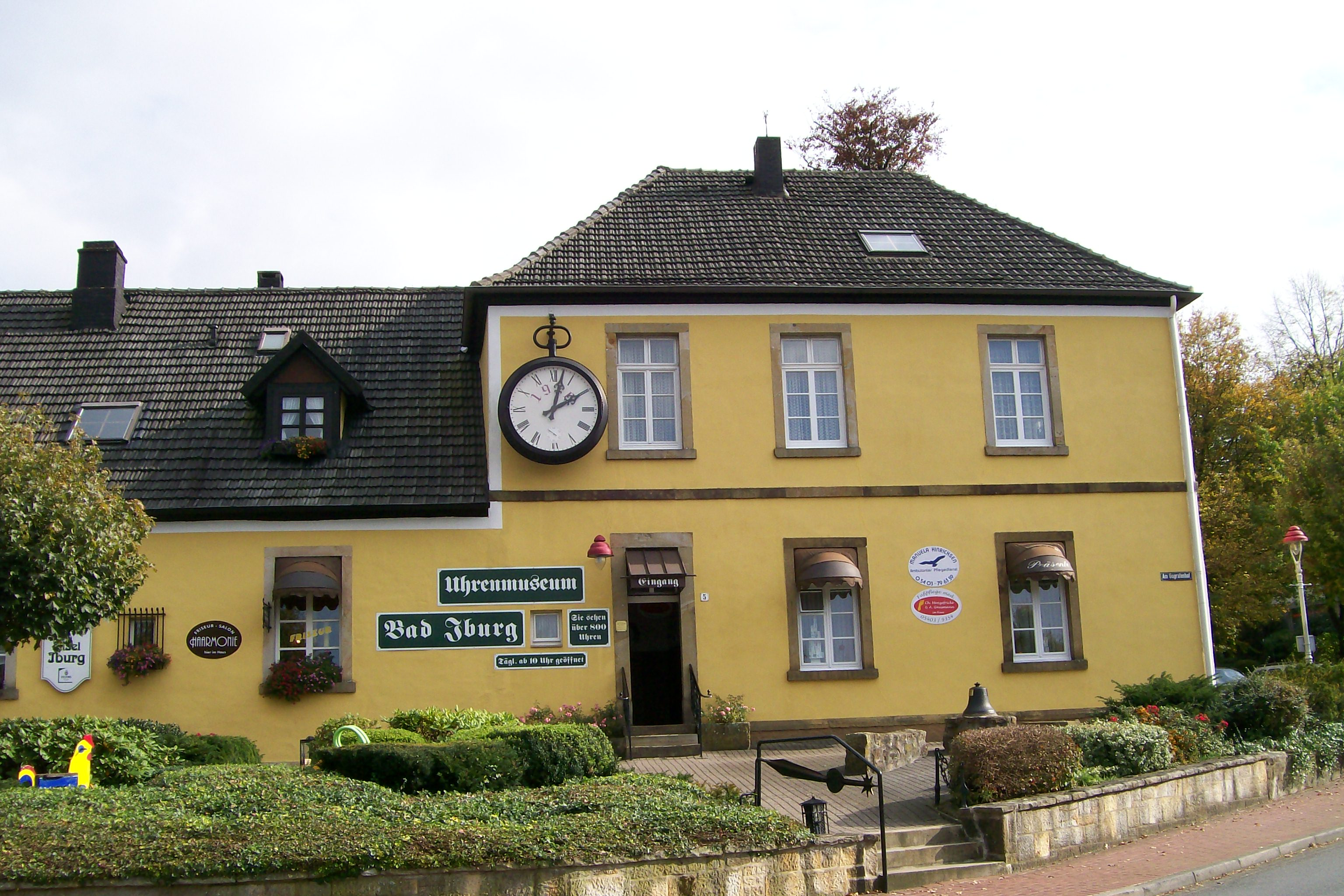
Uhrenmuseum

== Churches ==
The Fleckenskirche St. Nikolaus dates from the 13th century. The Roman Catholic Church is the oldest hall church in the Osnabrück district.

St. Jakobus der Ältere in Glane was erected in 1904/1905. The Roman Catholic Church in Gothic Revival architecture contains a pietà from 1420.

St. Clemens in the castle complex was the church of theBenedictine monastery. A hagioscope was rediscovered.

The Evangelische Schlosskirche which is also situated in the castle complex is the only Lutheran church in Bad Iburg.

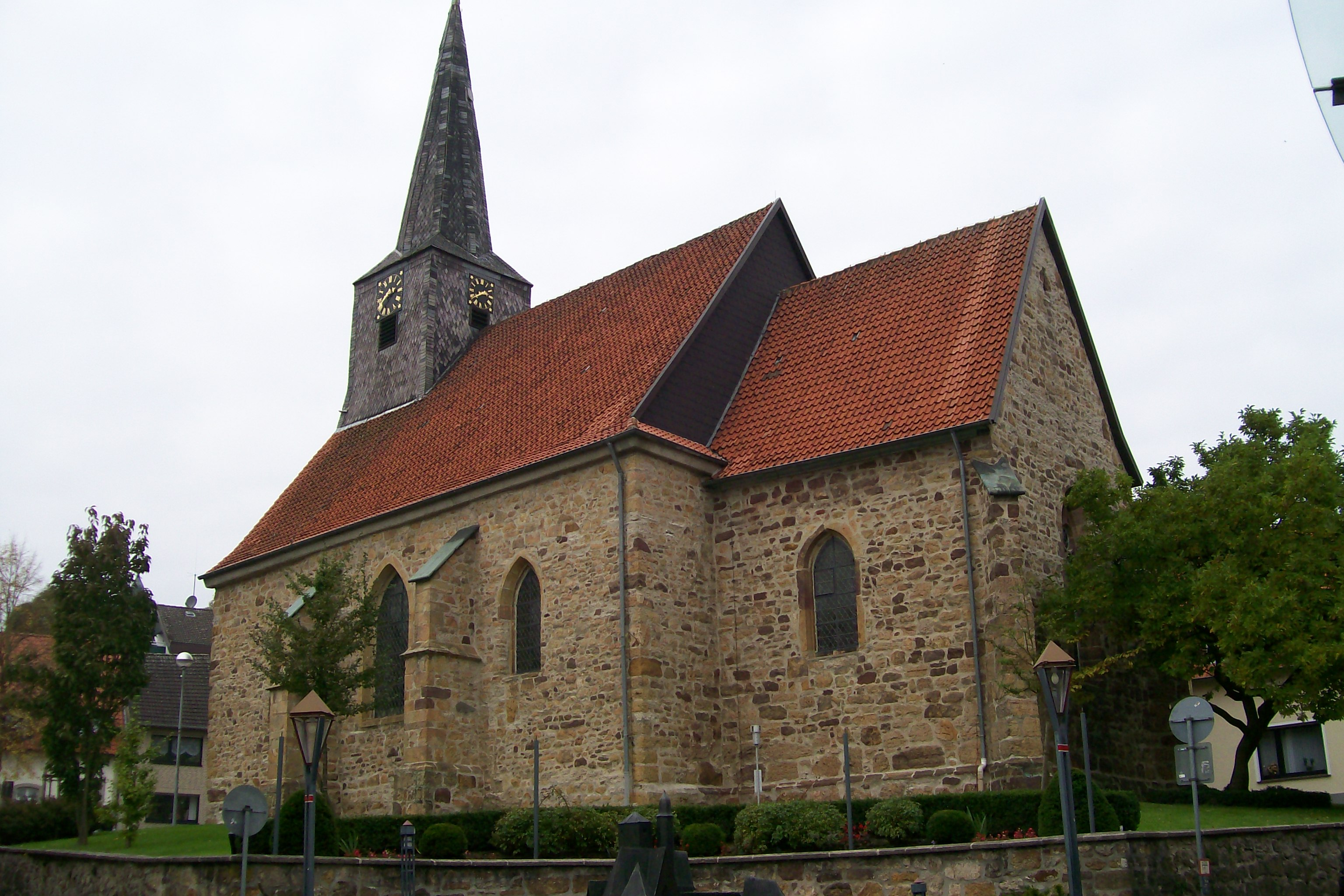
Fleckenskirche St. Nikolaus

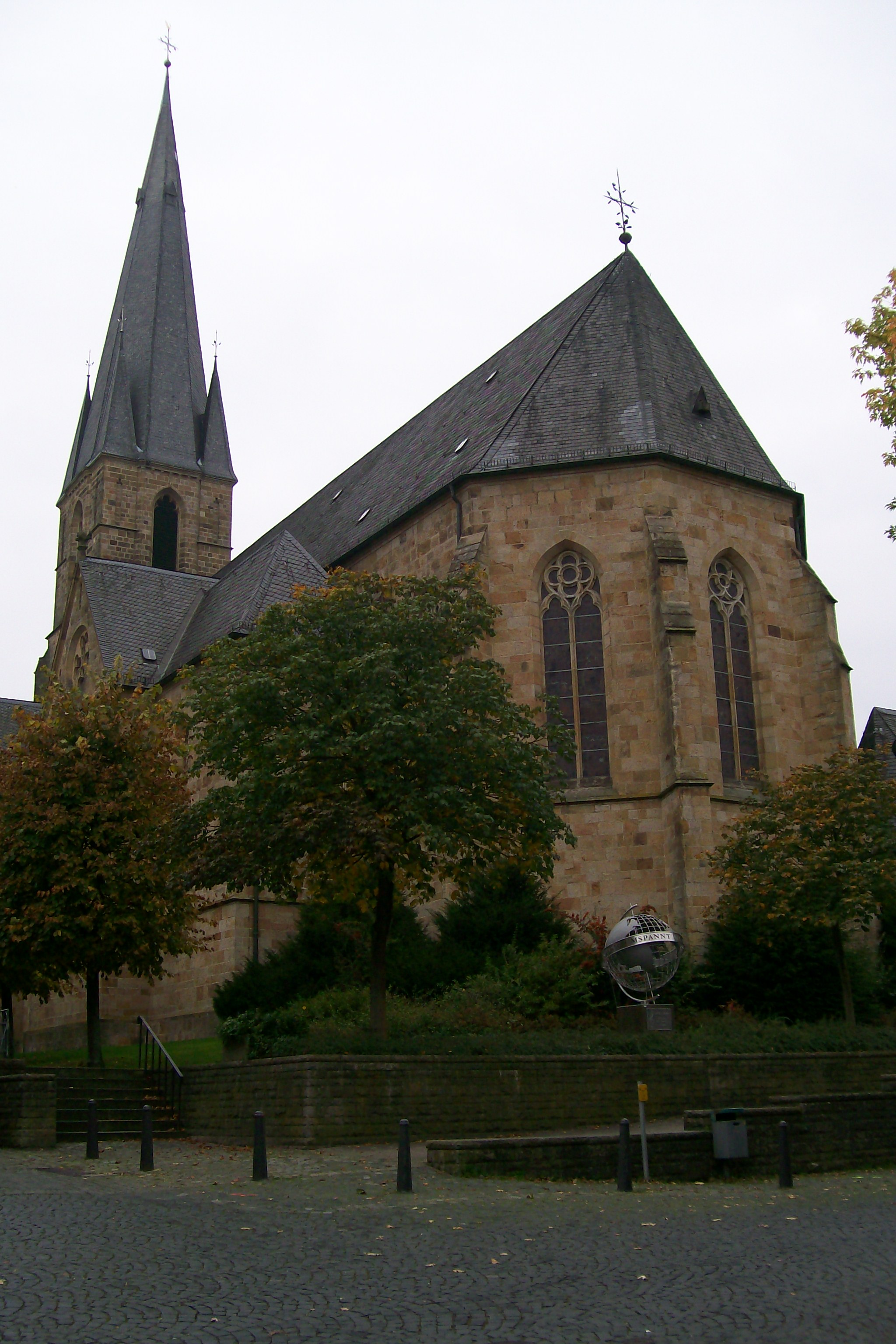
St. Jakobus der Ältere in Glane

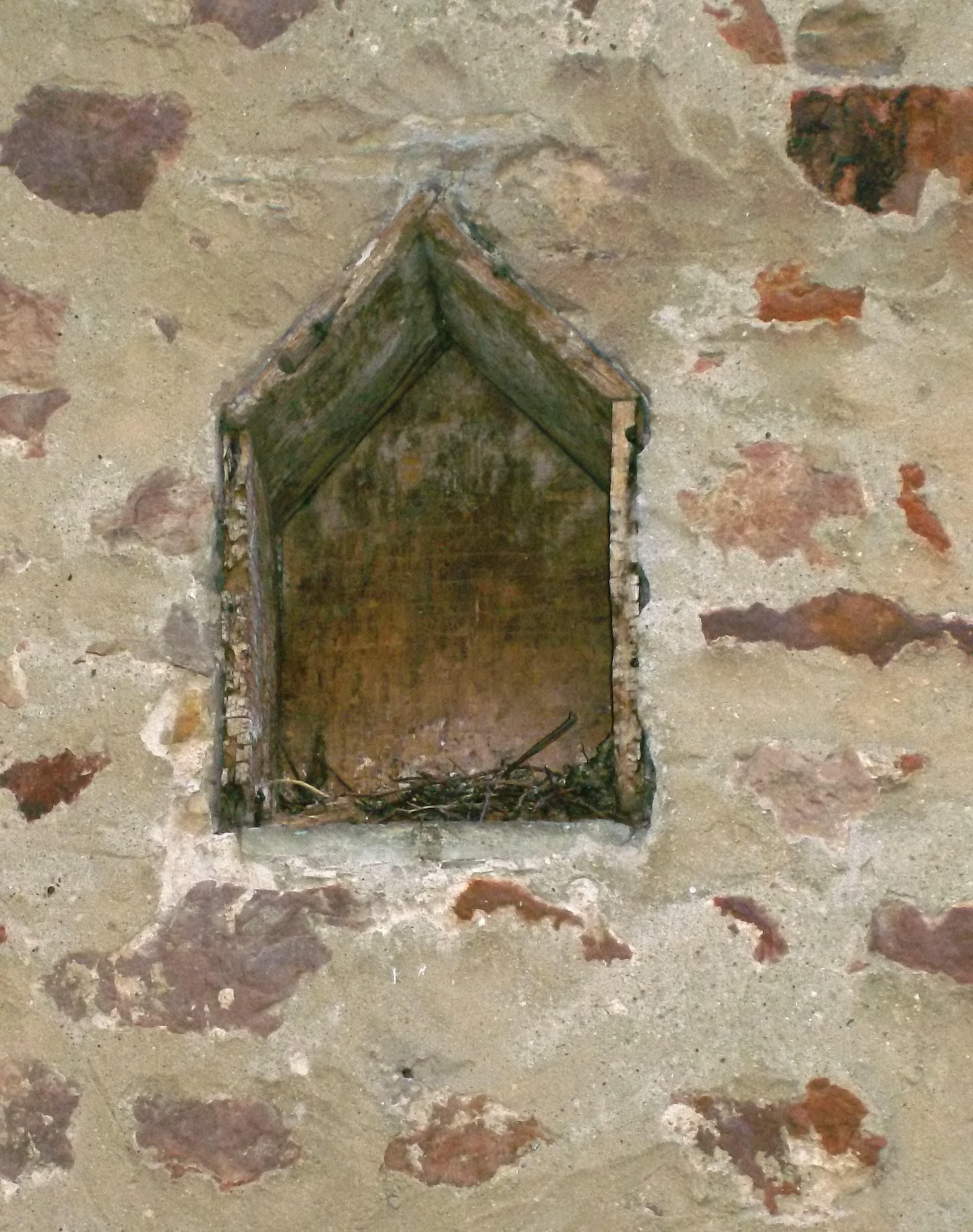
Hagioscope at St. Clemens

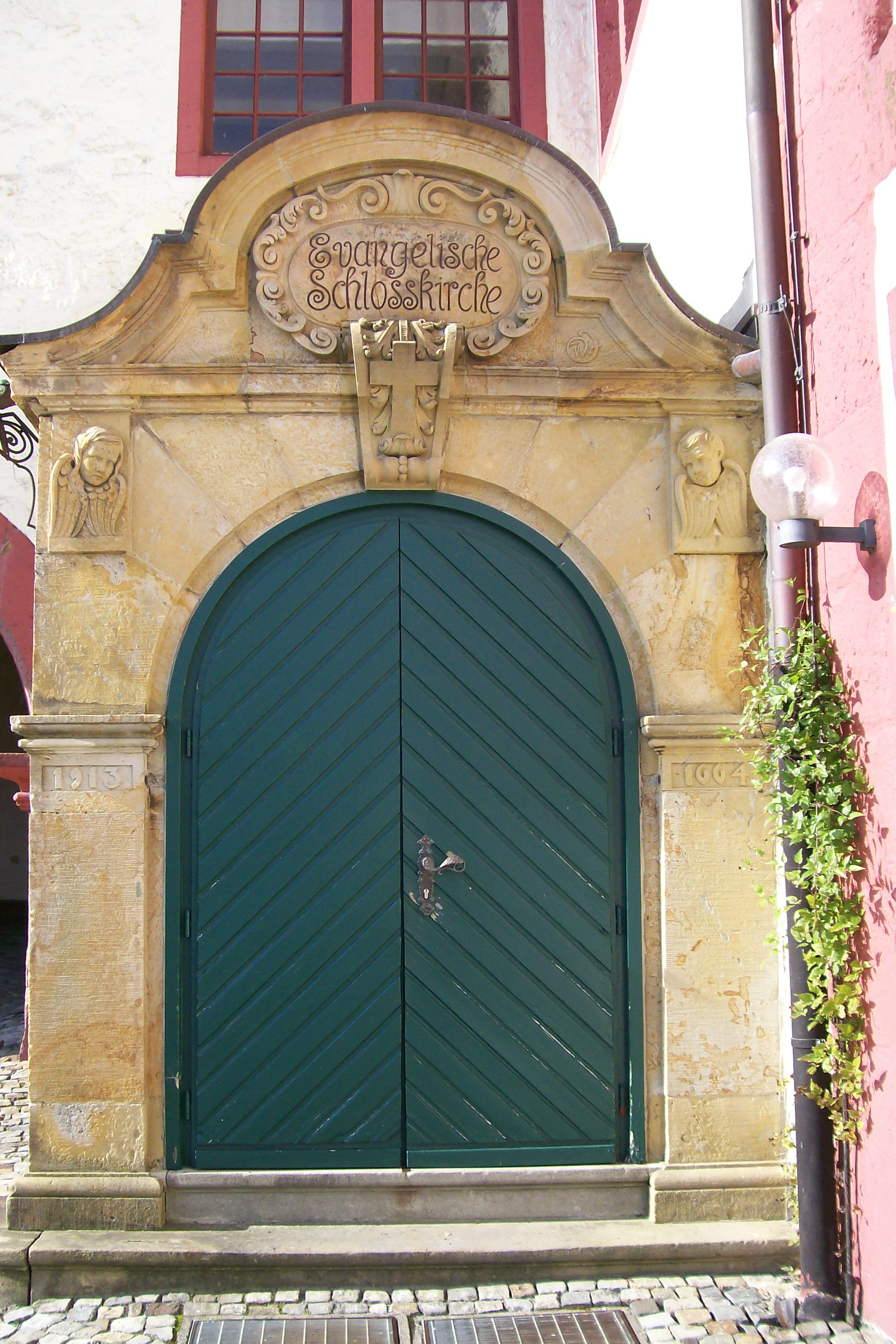
Entrance of Evangelische Schlosskirche

== Buildings ==
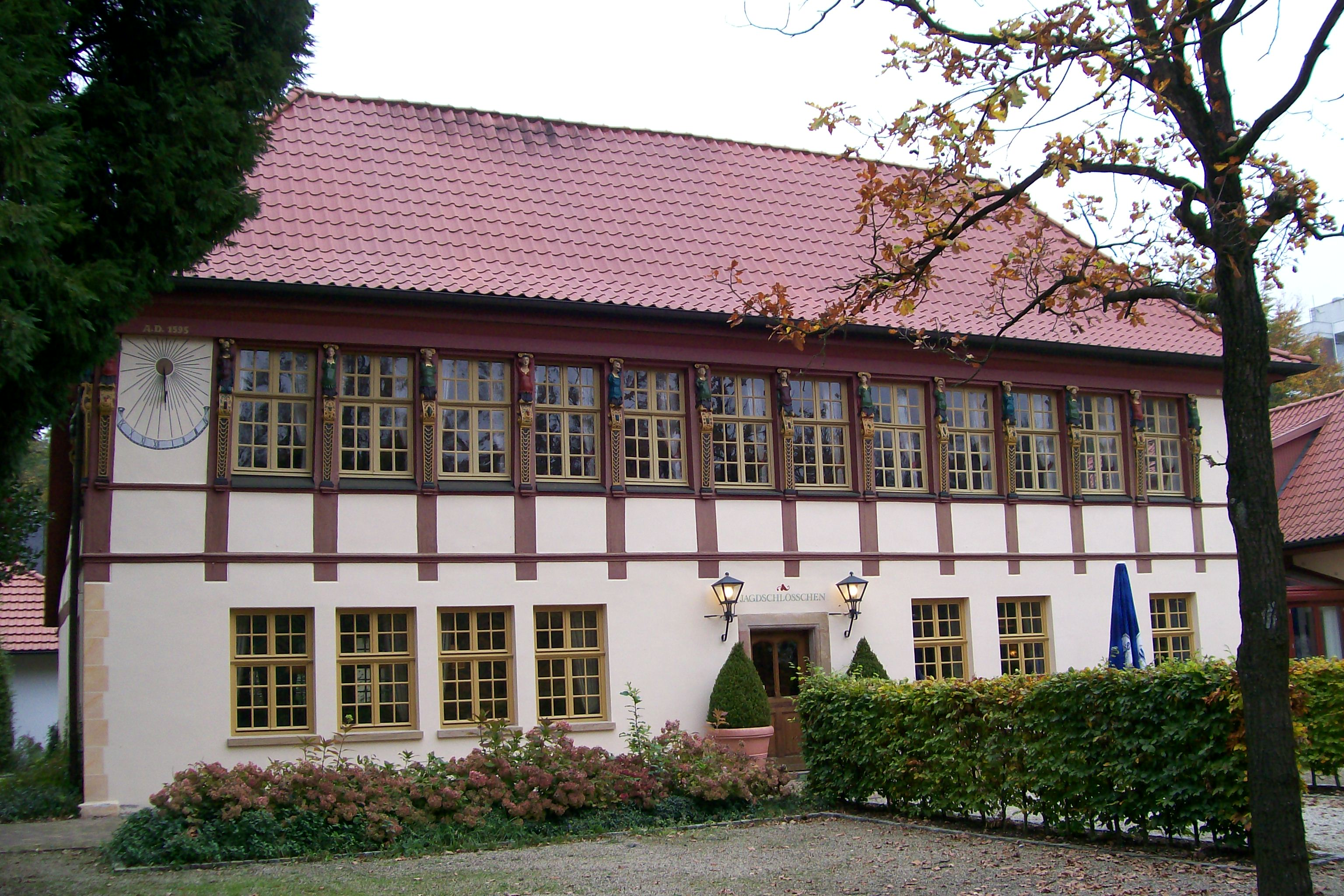
Jagdschlösschen

The Jagdschlösschen (hunting château), also known as Altes Forsthaus Freudenthal, was erected in 1595 by prince bishop Philipp Sigismund von Wolfenbüttel.

The Schlossmühle, the castle's mill, was also erected by Philipp Sigismund.

The Gografenhof, a classicism building, is used as the town hall since 1967. The kurhaus (spa facility/ resort) was opened in 1967 and torn down in 2010 following great local community debate (the area is now a grassed field and mainly used for local community events such as Schuetzenfest).

Burg Scheventorf is a former water castle built in 1552, but its history dates from the 14th century. It is situated south of the town centre. Nearby Schleppenburg which was destroyed was also a water castle.

== Sculptures ==
Bad Iburg has a number of sculptures made by Hans Gerd Ruwe from Osnabrück. These are the sculpture of Bishop Benno II, founder of the monastery, near the town hall, the Handwerkerbrunnen (craftsmen's fountain) in Große Straße, and the Trommlerbrunnen (drummer boy's fountain) in Glane. The Trommlerbrunnen reminds of the conferment of becoming a market town in 1764.

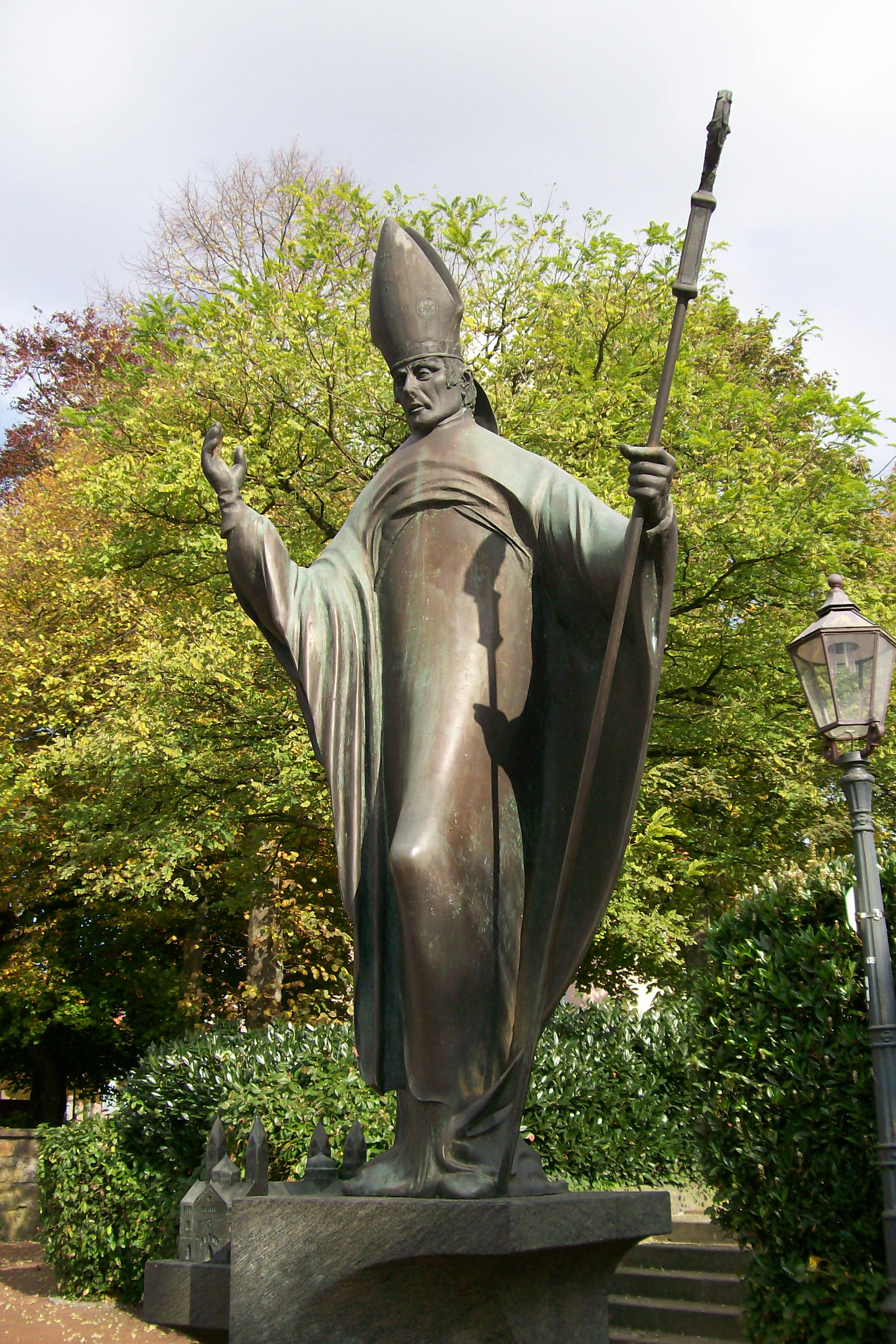
Bishop Benno II

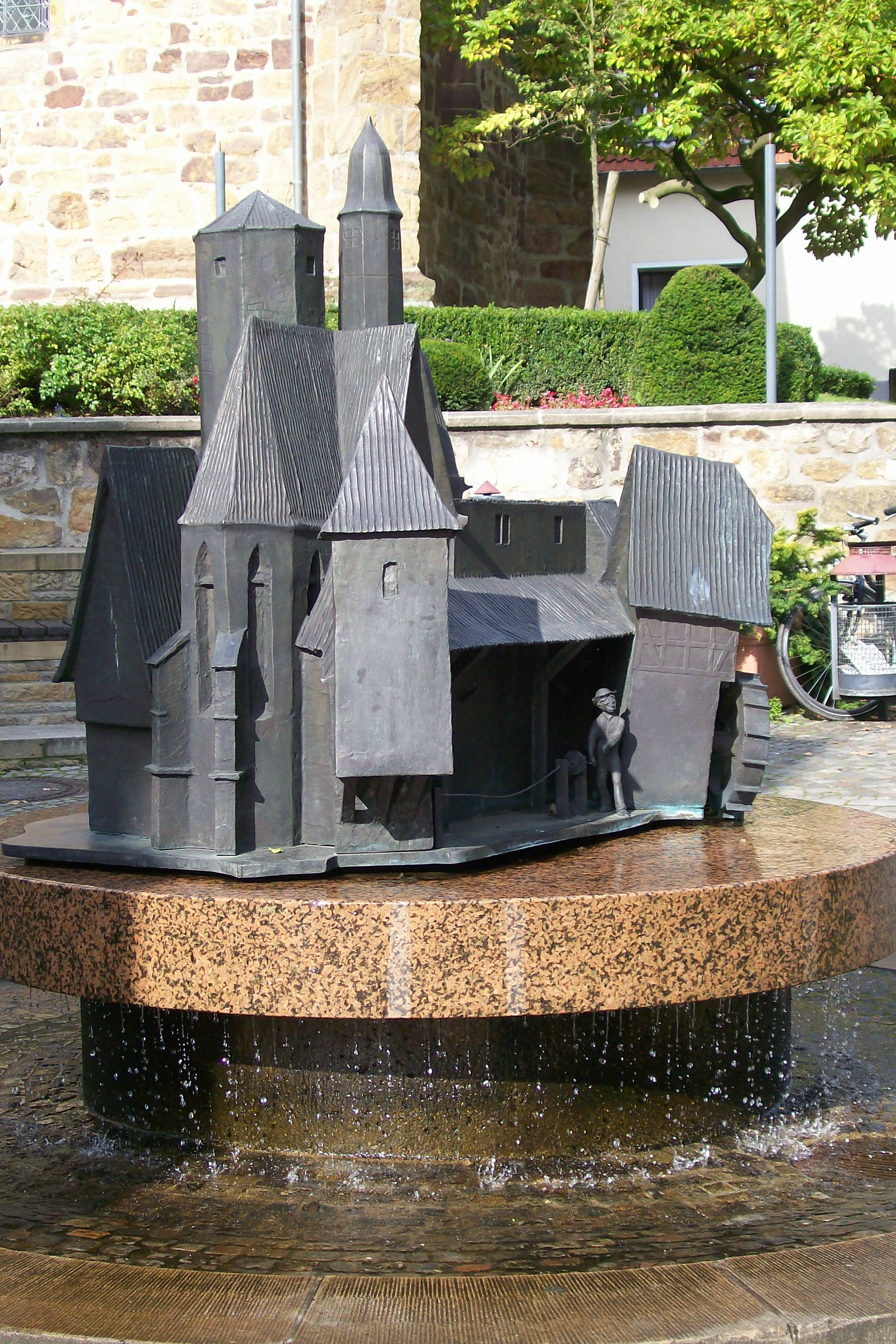
Handwerkerbrunnen

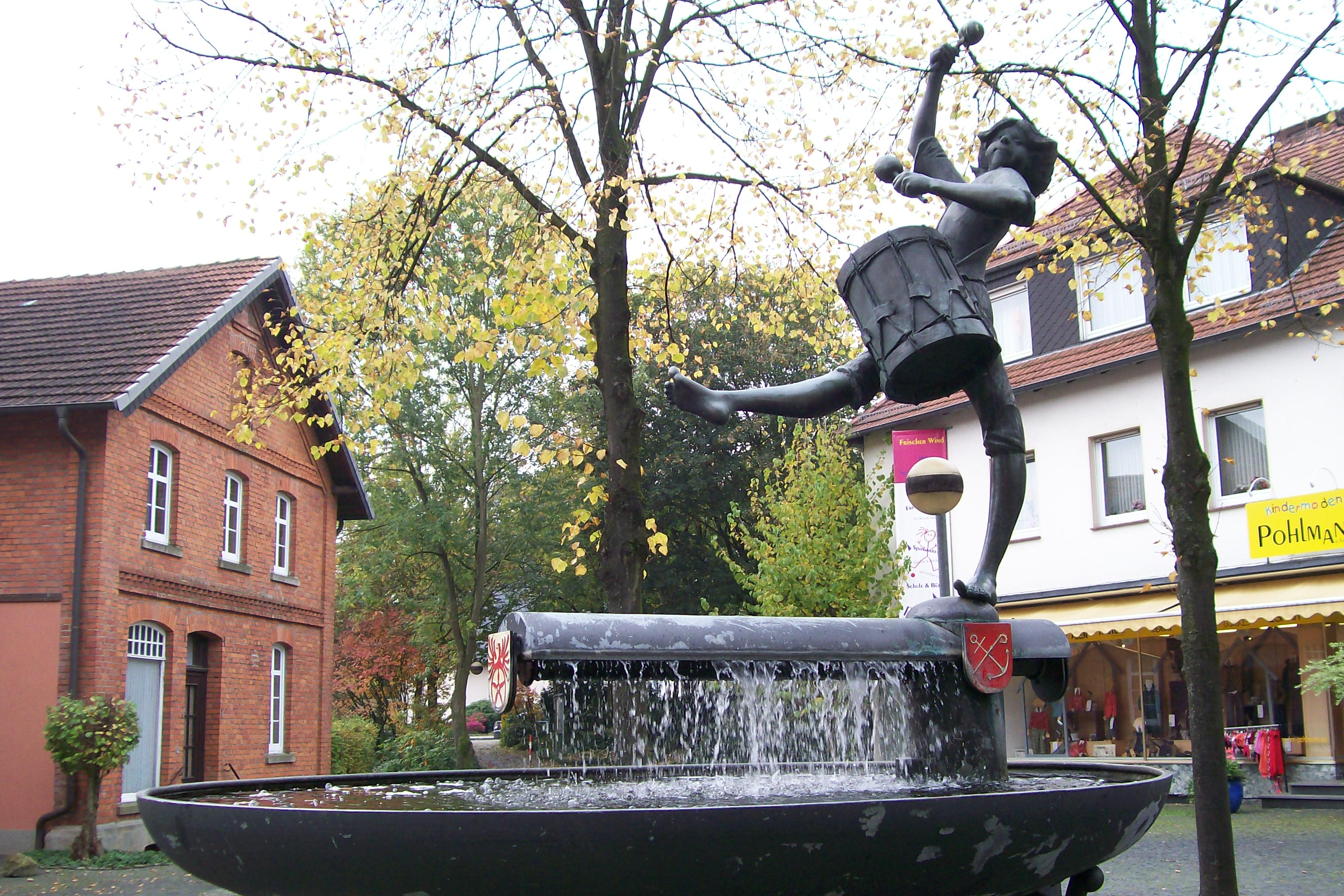
Trommlerbrunnen

== Personality ==
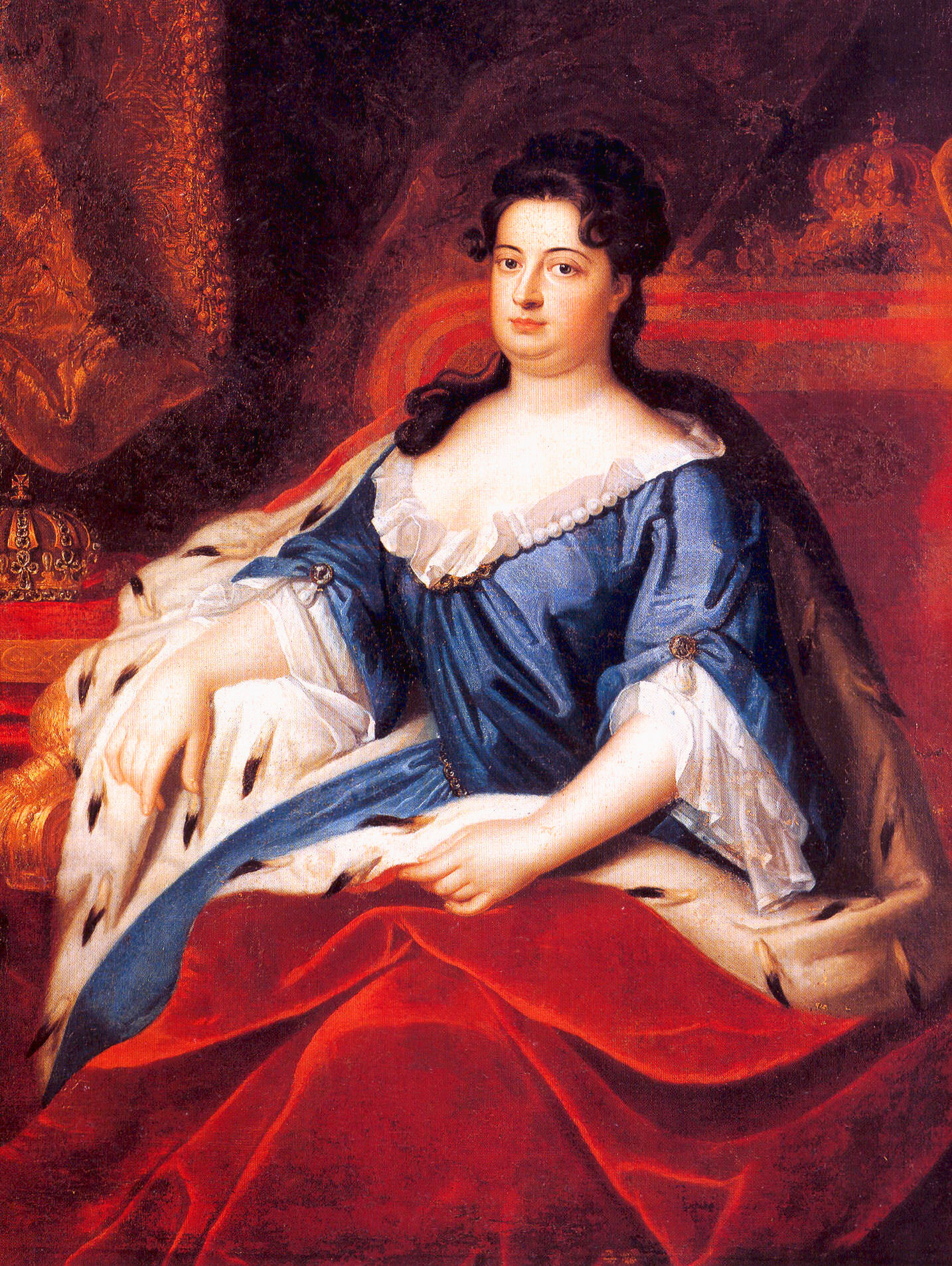
Sophie Charlotte of Hanover; Queen of Prussia 1705

=== Sons and daughters of the town ===
- Sophia Charlotte of Hanover (1668–1705), first queen of Prussia
- William Westmeyer (1829–1880), composer and pianist

=== Personalities associated with the city ===
- Bishop Benno II (around 1020–1088) founded the Benedictine monastery. He was buried in the Catholic castle church in 1088
- Eitel Frederick von Hohenzollern-Sigmaringen (1582–1625), Bishop of Osnabrück, died in 1625 in Schloss Iburg
