= Hagioscope =

Hole through a church wall allowing direct viewing of the altar

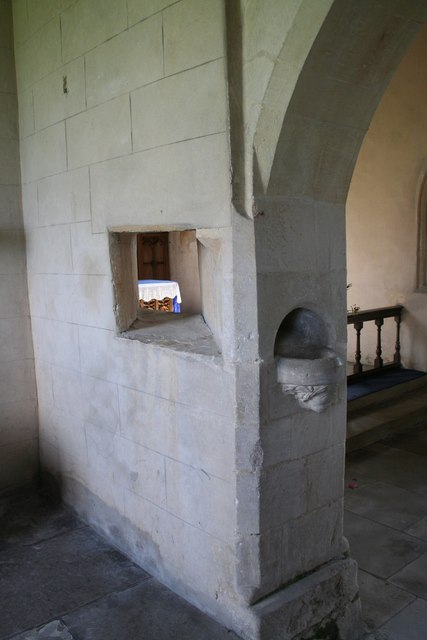
Squint in wall of north aisle chapel, St Nicholas's Church, Walcot, Lincolnshire, looking towards south-east, with a view of the high altar in the chancel beyond. To its right is a piscina supported by a carving of a man's head on the jamb of the wall.

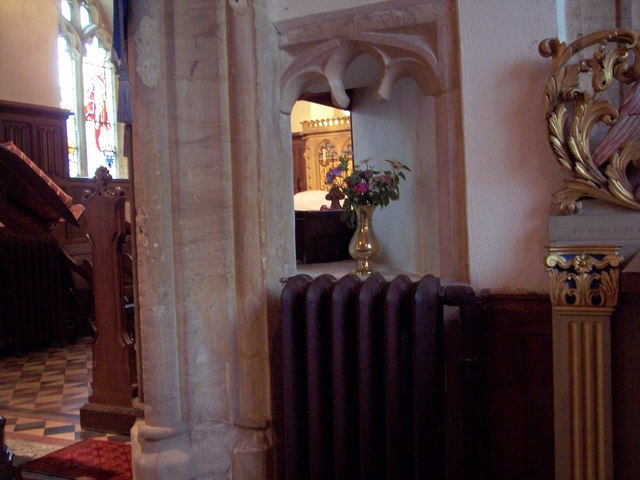
The squint at the Church of the Blessed Virgin Mary, Compton Pauncefoot, Somerset

A hagioscope (from Ancient Greek άγιος (ágios) 'holy' and σκοπεῖν (skopeîn) 'to see') or squint is an architectural term denoting a small splayed opening or tunnel at seated eye-level, through an internal masonry dividing wall of a church in an oblique direction (liturgical south-east or north-east), giving worshippers a view of the altar and therefore of the elevation of the host. Where worshippers were separated from the high altar not by a solid wall of masonry but by a transparent parclose screen, a hagioscope was not required as a good view of the high altar was available to all within the sectioned-off area concerned. In the 19th century, European antiquarians developed theories about the purpose of the squint and its relationship to people with leprosy and other non-desirables, namely that the feature would allow them to see the service without coming into contact with the rest of the populace, hence the terms leper windows or lychnoscopes. However, given the lack of medieval sources to definitively link the squint to fears of contagion, recent scholarship has contested these claims.

== Function ==
Where the congregation of a church is united in the nave there is no use for a hagioscope. However, when parts of the congregation separated themselves for purposes of social distinction, by use of walls or other screens from the chancel, or nave, and from the main congregation, such a need arose. In medieval architecture hagioscopes were often a low window in the chancel wall and were frequently protected by either a wooden shutter or iron bars. Hagioscopes are found on one or both sides of the chancel arch; in some cases a series of openings has been cut in the walls in an oblique line to enable a person standing in the porch (as in Bridgwater church, Somerset) to see the altar; in this case and in other instances such openings were sometimes provided for an attendant, who had to ring the Sanctus bell when the Host was elevated.

Though rarely encountered in continental Europe, they are occasionally found to serve such purposes as allowing a monk in one of the vestries to follow the service and to communicate with the bell-ringers. Sometimes squints were placed to enable nuns or anchorites to observe the services without having to give up their isolation. Anchorites could view the Eucharist without being able to observe the congregation. The unusual design of the church of St Helen's in Bishopsgate, one of the largest surviving ancient churches of London, arose from its once having been two separate places of worship: a 13th-century parish church and the chapel of a Benedictine convent. On the convent side of St Helen's Church, a "squint" allowed the nuns to observe the parish masses; church records show that the squint in this case was not enough to restrain the nuns, who were eventually admonished to "abstain from kissing secular persons", a practice to which it seems they had become "too prone".

== Surviving examples ==
=== Finland ===
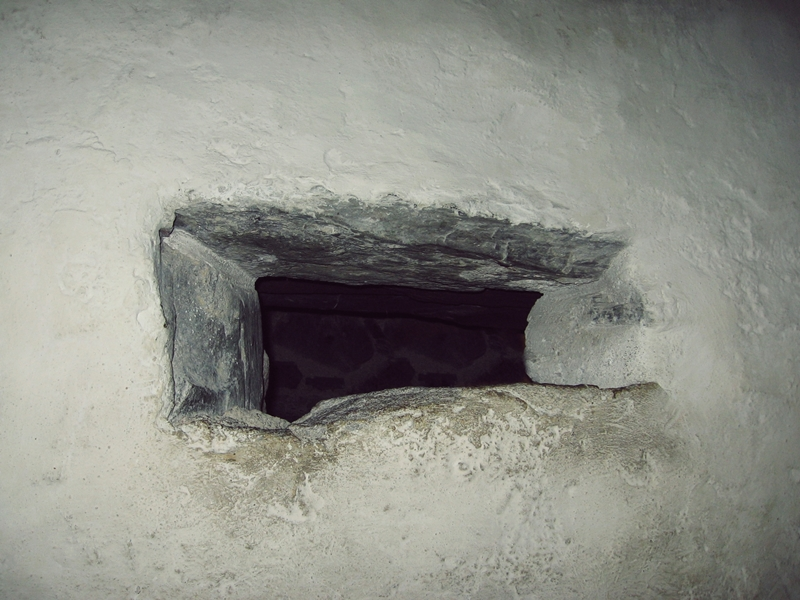
Hagioscope at Olavinlinna in Eastern Finland

There is only one hagioscope in Finland, at Olavinlinna (St. Olaf's Castle), in the town of Savonlinna. Here, the squint has enabled some congregants to continue gathering at the dark, damp stone church tower through the dead of winter, despite forbidding temperatures and weather conditions.

=== France ===
In France, the hagioscope of Notre-Dame in Dives-sur-Mer, Normandy, has the inscription trou aux lépreux (leper window). Other hagioscopes are known at St. Laurent in Deauville, Normandy and at the old church of St. Maurice in Freyming-Merlebach, Lorraine.

=== Germany ===
In Germany, a number of hagioscopes still exist or were rediscovered in the 19th and 20th century. They are found mainly in Lower Saxony which had a small population in the Middle Ages and only a few bigger cities. In cities people with leprosy lived together in housing estates which often had their own chapels. In Georgsmarienhütte the hagioscope of church St. Johann belonged to the former Benedictine convent Kloster Oesede, founded in the 12th century and reconstructed in the early 1980s. Nearby in Bad Iburg a hagioscope was rediscovered at St. Clemens, church of former Benedictine monastery in the castle and monastery complex Schloss Iburg. Other hagioscopes in Lower Saxony are found in Bokelesch, Westoverledingen, Dornum, Midlum, Kirchwahlingen (Gemeinde Böhme) and Hankensbüttel.

In Northrhine-Westphalia, St. Antonius-Kapelle in Gescher-Tungerloh-Capellen has a hagioscope. St. Antonius is used as Autobahn chapel at Bundesautobahn 31. Another hagioscope is found in St. Ulricus in Börninghausen. In Rhineland-Palatinate the church of St. Eligius-Hospital in Neuerburg has a hagioscope. In Baden-Württemberg there is a hagioscope in St. Peter und Paul, the Old Cemetery Church of Nusplingen.

=== Ireland ===
- A leper's squint (now blocked up) is visible at St Mary's Cathedral, Limerick.
- Athenry Priory also once had a leper's squint
- Furness Church, 13th century Norman church near Naas
- St Mary's Church, Inis Cealtra has a stone opening believed to be a leper's squint

=== Netherlands ===
St. Vitus in Wetsens, and Jistrum, both in Friesland, have hagioscopes, as does the oldest church in the Netherlands, which stands in Oosterbeek.

=== Sweden ===
In Sweden, Bro Church near Visby on Gotland has a cross-shaped hagioscope. Another church on Gotland with a hagioscope is Atlingbo Church. Other hagioscopes are at the church of Vreta Abbey near Linköping, Granhult Kyrka in Uppvidinge and Husaby Kyrka in Götene. The wooden church in Granhult (Småland) has a hagioscope which can be closed.

=== United Kingdom ===
Churches in England with hagioscopes include:

- Church of St Mary the Virgin, Gamlingay, Cambridgeshire
- St Wynwallow's Church, Landewednack, Cornwall
- St Anietus's Church, St Neot, Cornwall
- St Corentin's Church, Cury, Cornwall
- St Martin's Church, St Martin-by-Looe, Cornwall
- St Cyricius and St Julietta's Church, St Veep, Cornwall
- Church of St Sampson, South Hill, Cornwall
- Stoke Climsland Church, Cornwall
- St Petroc's Church, Trevalga, Cornwall
- St James' in Great Ormside, Cumbria
- St Mary's, Lytchett Matravers, Dorset (a particularly large example)
- St Mary and St Cuthbert, Chester-le-Street, Durham
- St Mary's Church, Easington, County Durham
- St Thomas à Becket Church, Lewes, East Sussex
- St. Laurence and All Saints Church, Eastwood, Essex
- St Andrew and St Bartholomew's Church, Ashleworth, Gloucestershire
- Church of the Holy Rood, Holybourne, Hampshire
- St Michael & All Angels Church, Farthinghoe, Northamptonshire
- St James The Less, Sulgrave, Northamptonshire
- St Cuthbert's Church, Beltingham, Northumberland
- St Oswald's Church, Sowerby, North Yorkshire
- St Peter's in Upton, Nottinghamshire
- St Peter's Church at Great Haseley, Oxfordshire
- St Nicholas's Church, Old Marston, Oxfordshire
- St Nicholas' Church, Kenilworth, Warwickshire

== Gallery ==
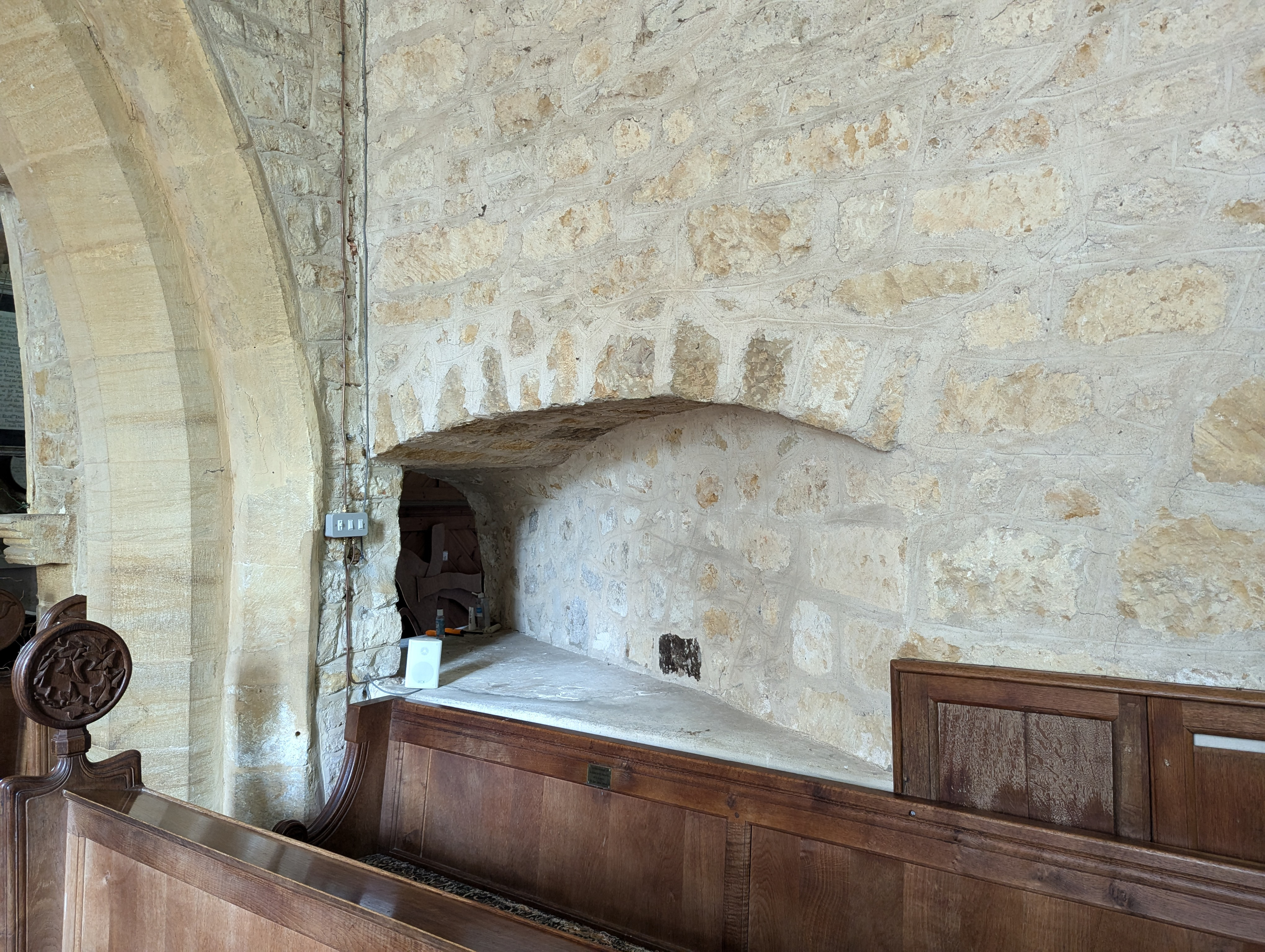
The squint in the south transept of St. John the Baptist church at Symondsbury, Dorset, England. The north transept has a matching squint although currently not used because the church-organ occupies much of the north transept.

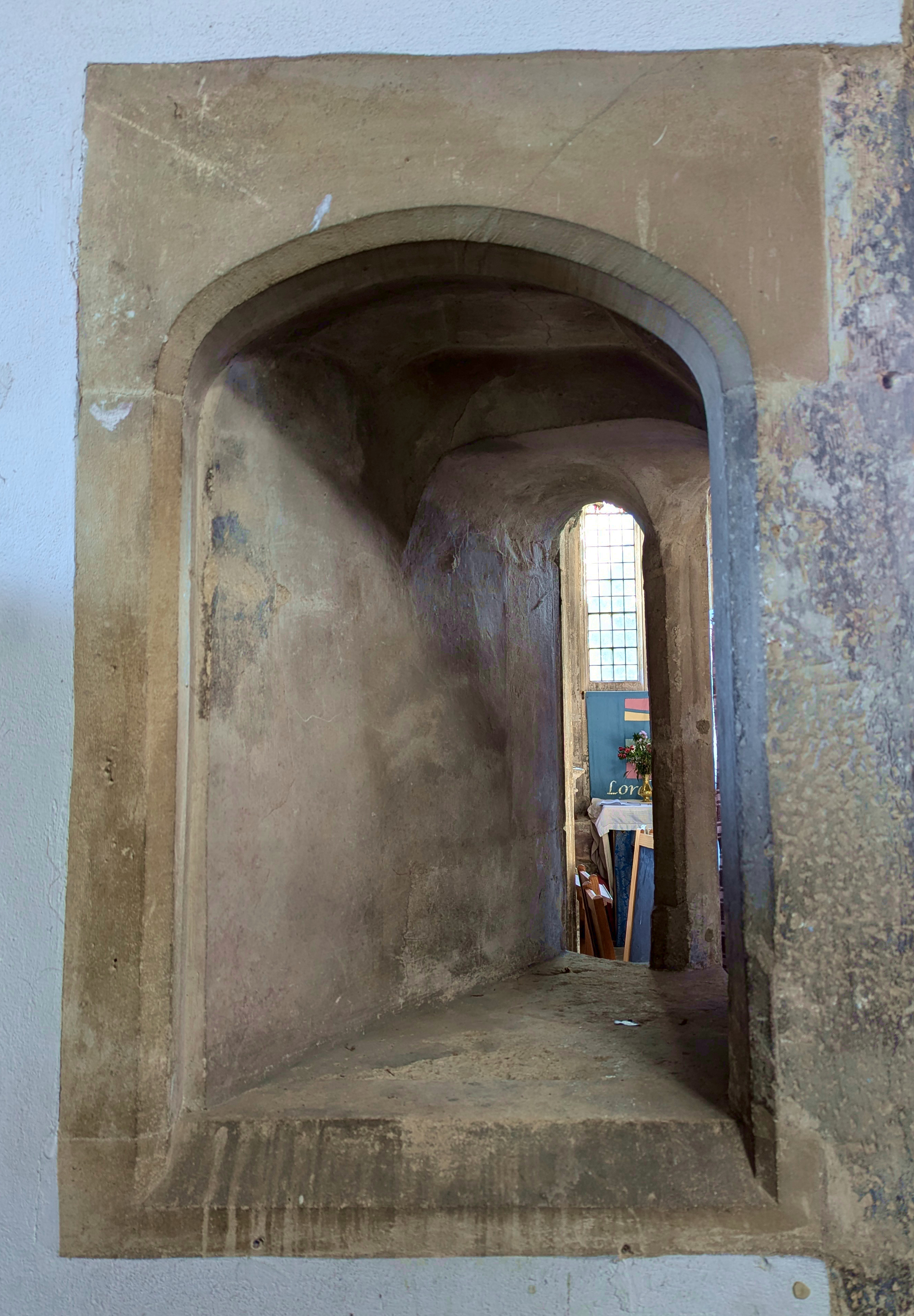
The squint at St. Cyriac's church at Lacock, Wiltshire, England. September 2024.

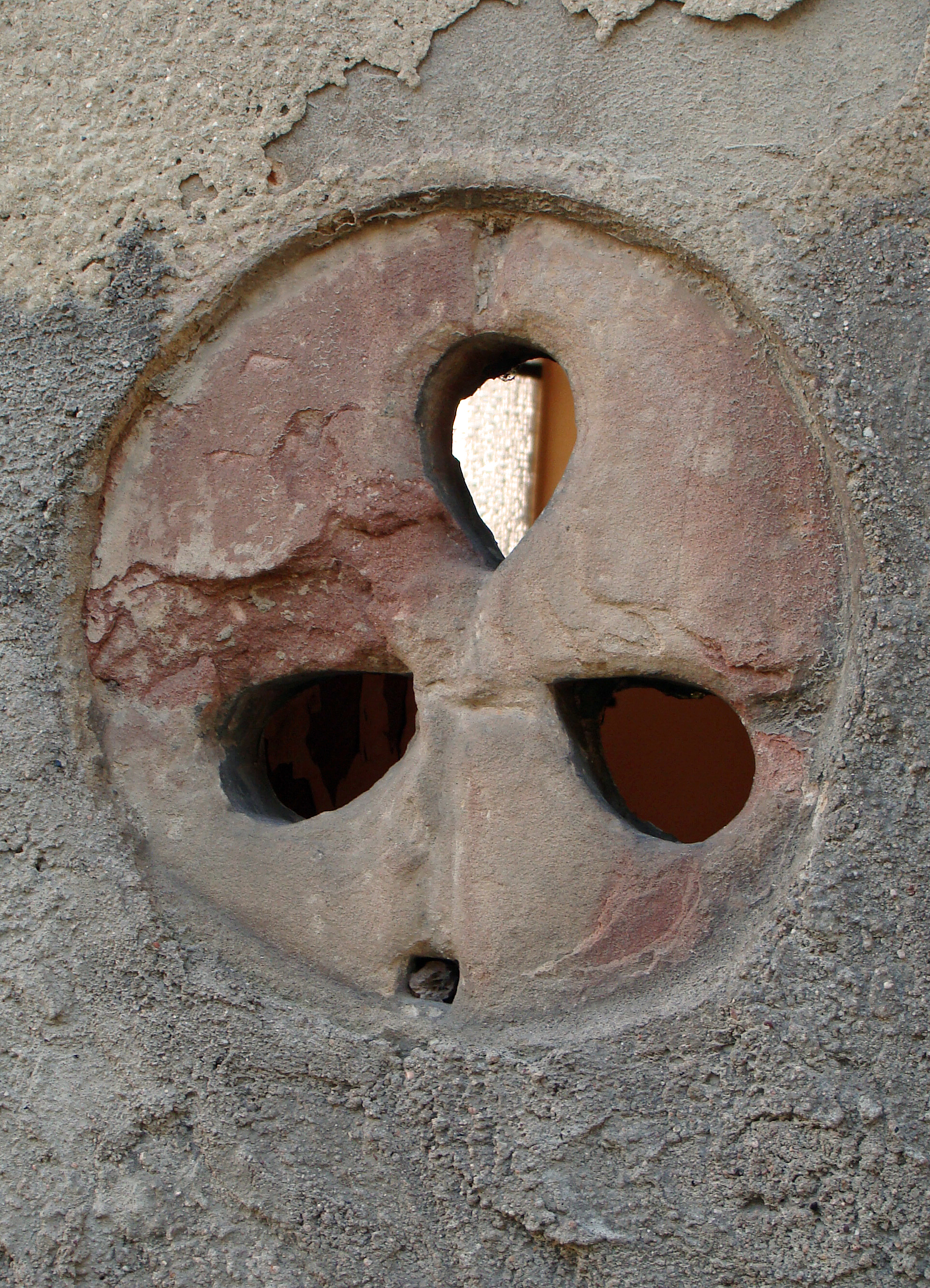
Hagioscope, old church of Saint-Maurice, Freyming-Merlebach, Moselle, France

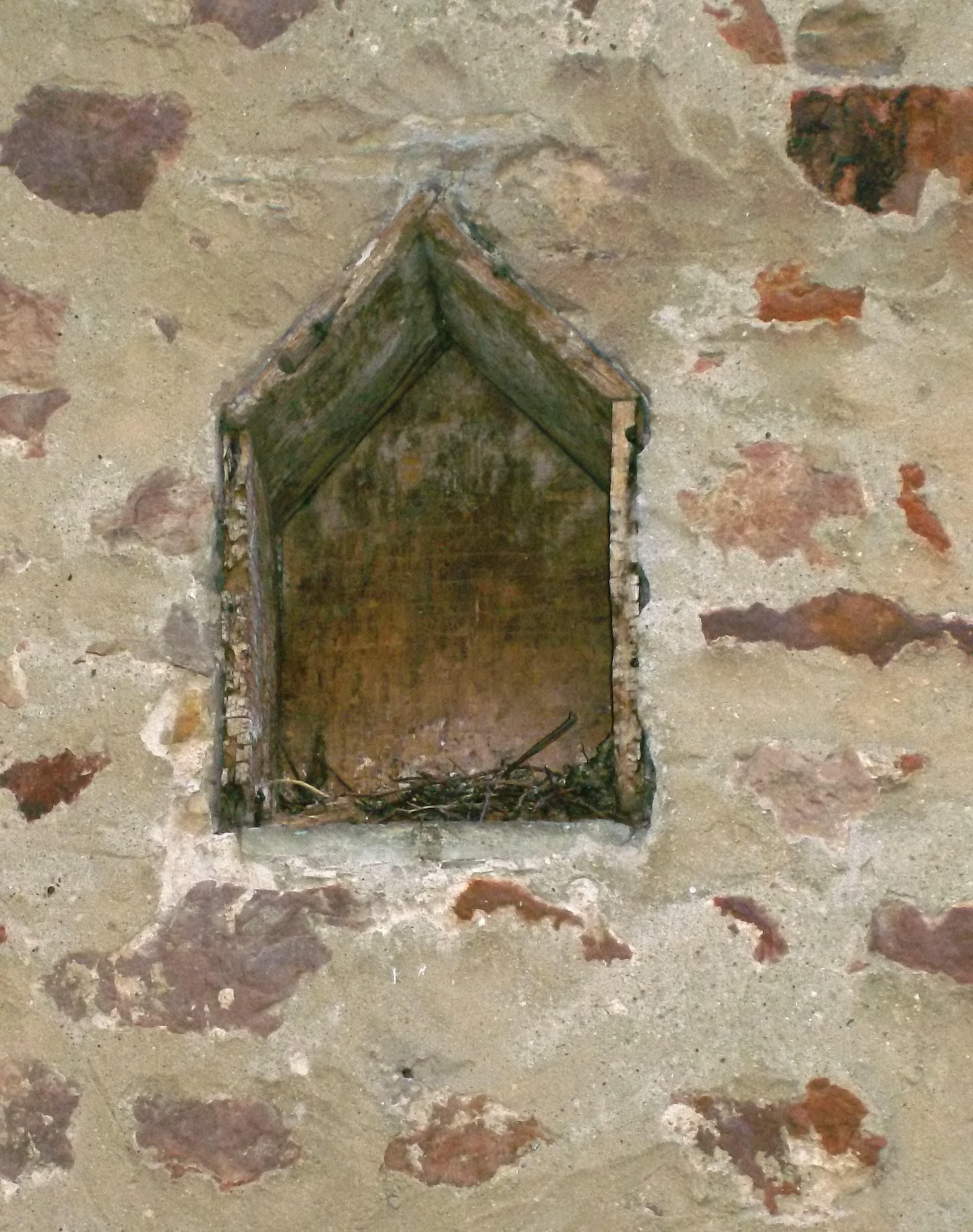
The hagioscope of St. Clemens, Bad Iburg, Germany.

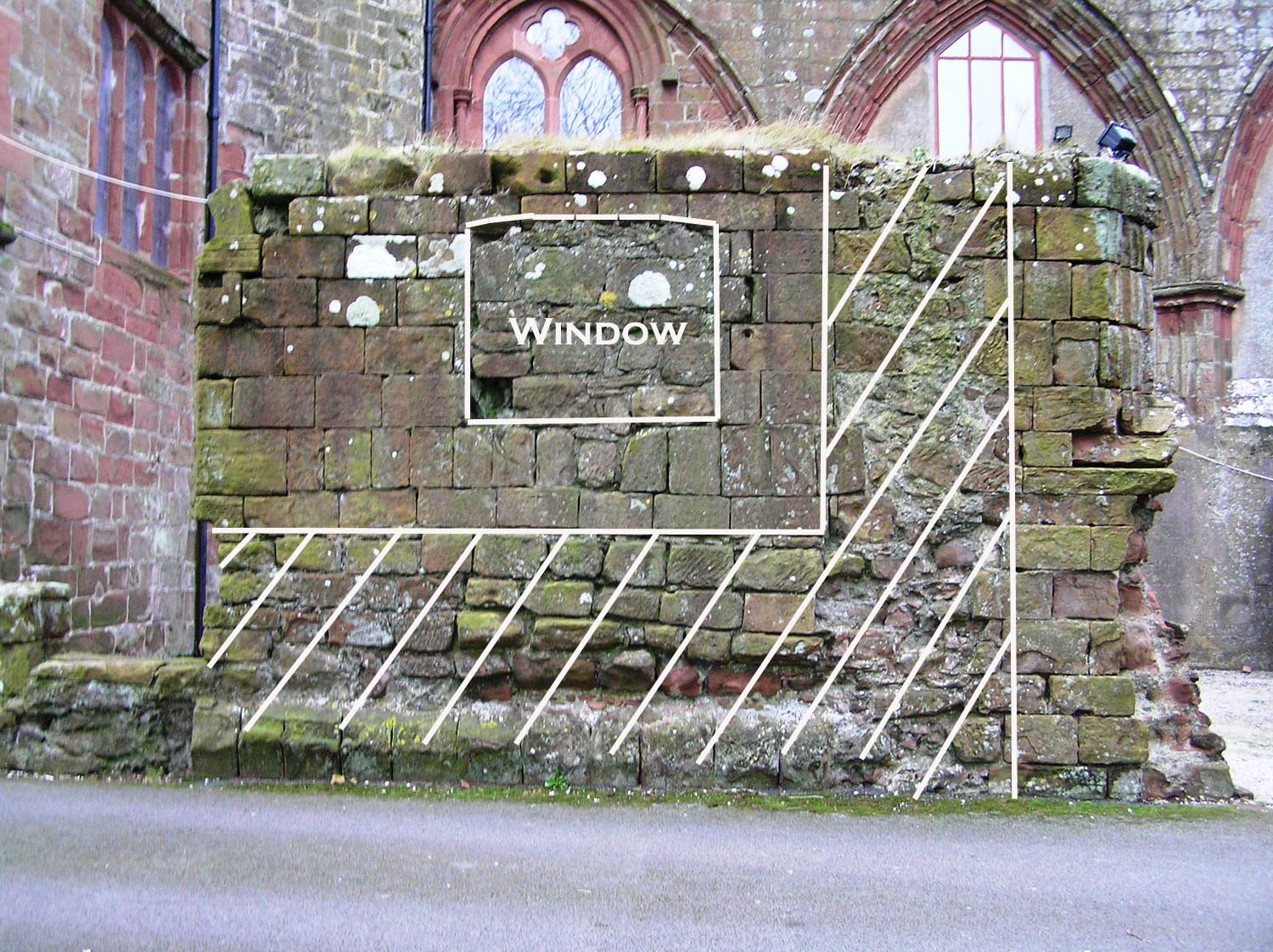
St Bees Priory, Cumbria: Squint window in the wall of chapel built 1270–1300. Window is infilled, but outline is shown, and cross hatch shows wall and floor abutments.

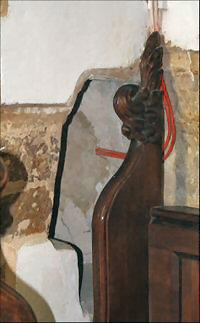
A partially blocked squint at Grendon church, Northamptonshire.

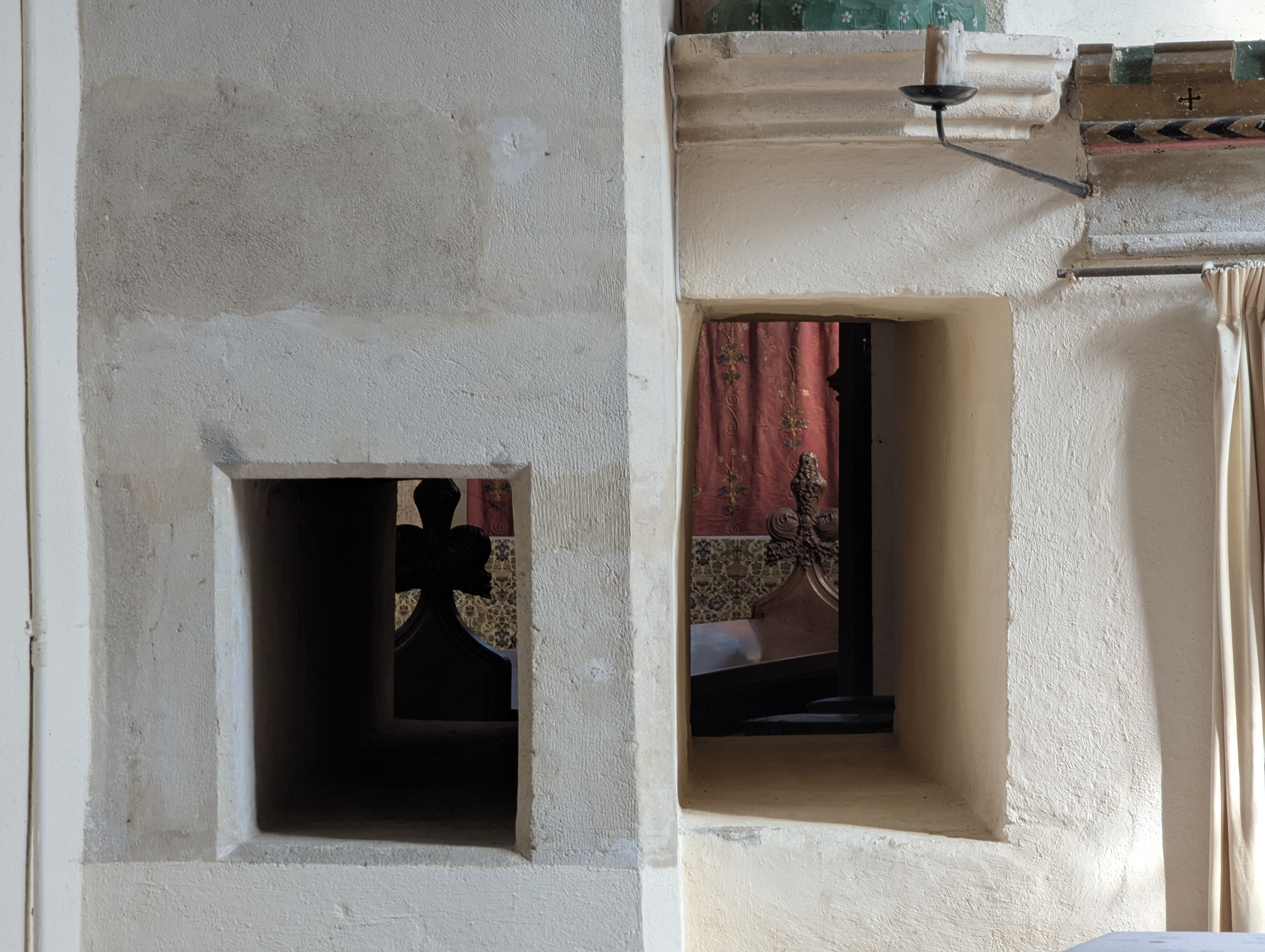
A double squint in St Peter's Church at Great Haseley, Oxfordshire, England. March 2025.

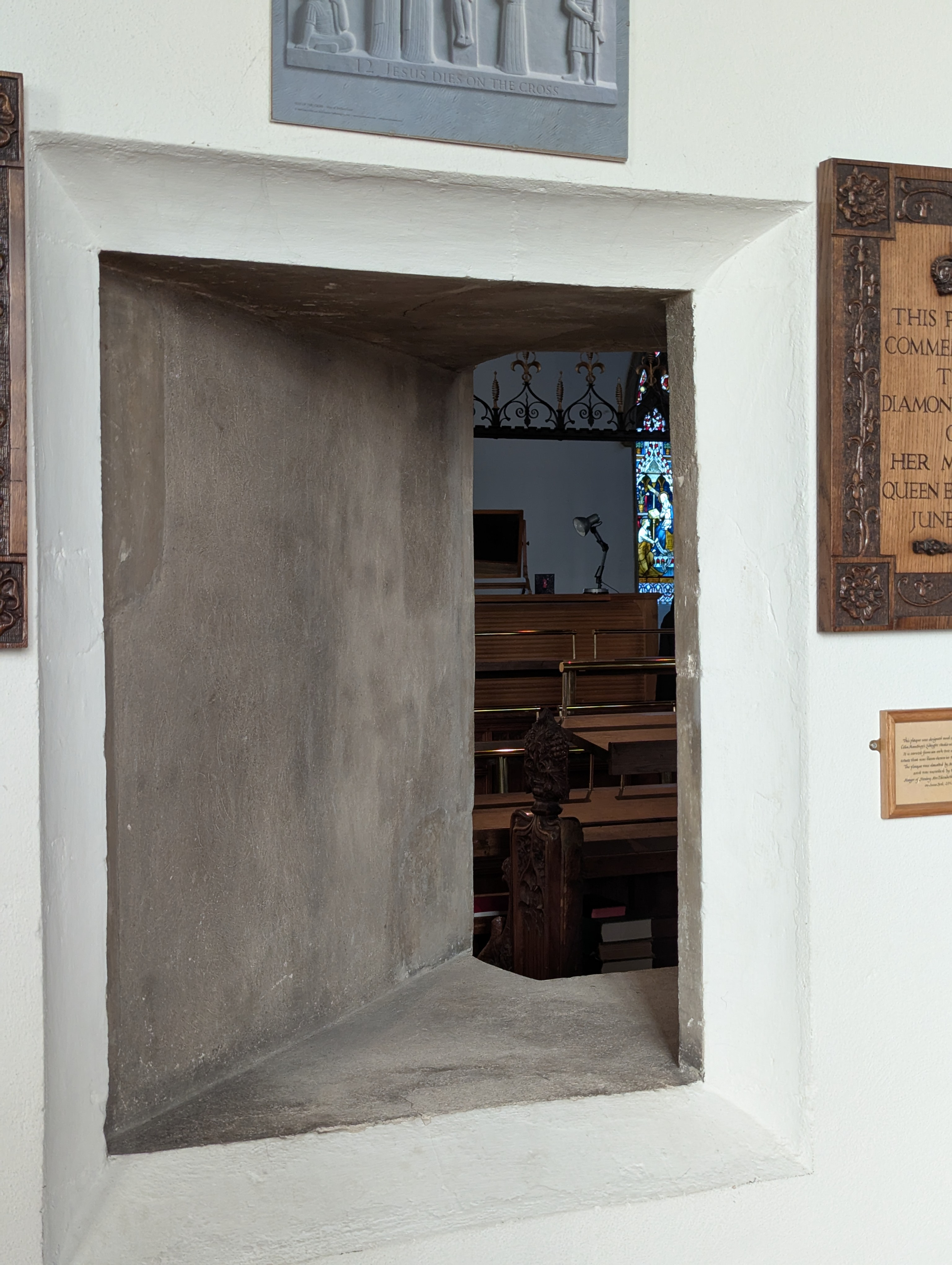
A squint in the south aisle, at St. Mary the Virgin church at Henley On Thames, Oxfordshire, England. January 2025.

== See also ==
- Passthrough (opening)

== Sources ==
- Parker, John Henry (1846). "On Some Perforations in the Walls of Churches". Archaeological Journal. 3 (1): 299–308. doi:10.1080/00665983.1846.10850614. ISSN 0066-5983.
