= Furness Church =

- Forenaghts Church
- Séipéal Fhornochta
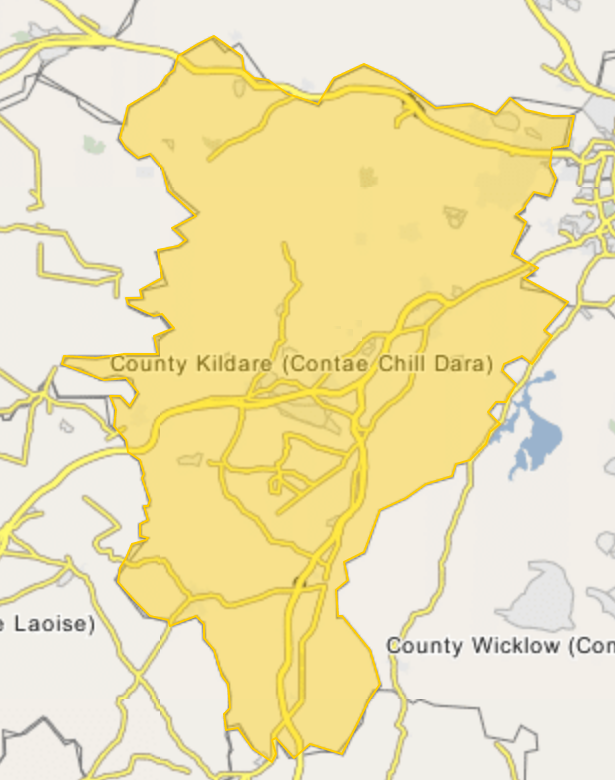
- Location within County Kildare
- 53°13′24″N 6°36′05″W
- Location: Forenaghts Great, County Kildare
- Country: Ireland
- Denomination: Church of Ireland
- Previous denomination: Pre-Reformation Catholic

History
- Founded: 13th century

Architecture
- Style: Gothic

Administration
- Diocese: Kildare and Leighlin

National monument of Ireland
- Official name: Furness Church
- Reference no.: 394

Furness Church is a 13th-century Norman church located in County Kildare, Ireland.

== Location ==
Furness Church is located outside Furness House; 2 km (1.3 mi) southeast of Johnstown, County Kildare.

== The building and site ==
Furness contains a 'calendar stone' dating to c. 3500 BC.

The church is in the grounds of Furness House, owned by Patrick Guinness. The church is Early Christian (c. AD 500) and it was extended by the Normans in 1210. On the Norman conquest of Ireland after 1169, lands in Kildare were assigned to Adam de Hereford who in turn bequeathed them to the Abbey of St Thomas the Martyr, Dublin. This monastery extended the church in 1210, allowing a roof for the congregation. The name derives from the Irish fornocht, meaning "bare hill." In the 1530s the monastery was dissolved by the Crown and its land at Furness was bought by the Ashe family, merchants in Naas.

The church has doors and windows edged with tufa, a form of limestone favoured by Cistercians in Europe from the 12th century onward. The exception is a leper window, usually blocked up now in older churches.

At some point the church burned down and was abandoned. Despite being Protestant, the Nevill family owning the land allowed local Catholics to continue to bury their dead around the church alongside their ancestors. One gravestone from the early 18th century reads IHS, signifying a Catholic burial. Burials stopped in the 1840s when the then owners built a wall around the estate as a famine relief measure.

A standing stone is located 300 m (330 yd) north-northeast of the church.
