= Benno II of Osnabrück =

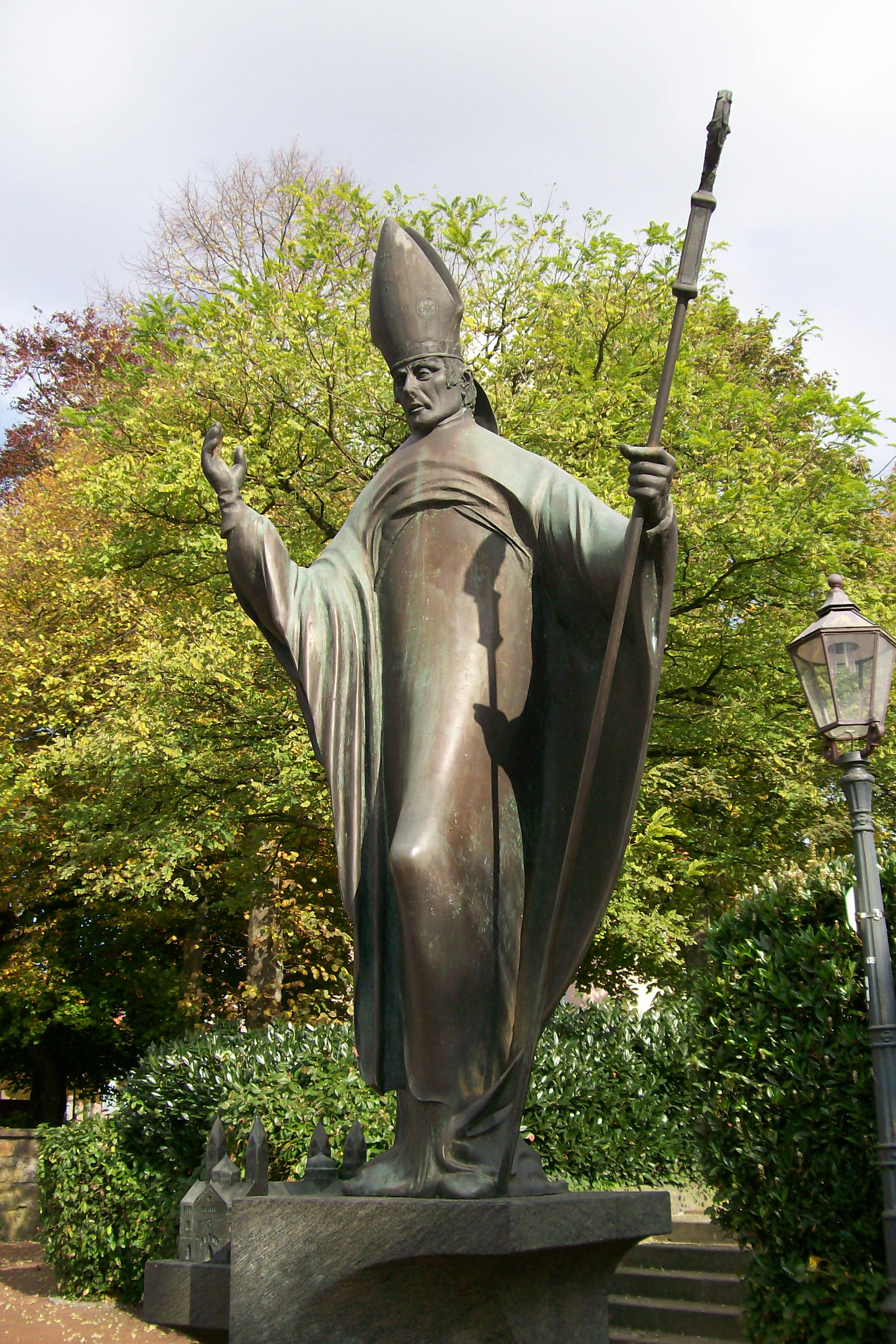
Modern statue of Bishop Benno II, Bad Iburg

Benno II (c. 1020 – 27 July 1088) was Bishop of Osnabrück from 1068 until his death. He served as a close advisor and architect of Emperor Henry IV. In 1080 he founded the Benedictine abbey of Iburg Castle.

== Life ==
He was born at Löhningen (today part of Ühlingen-Birkendorf) in Klettgau, Swabia, the son of a ministerial family. His parents sent him at an early age to the monastic schools of Straßburg and Reichenau where the learned Herman Contractus was then teaching. Together with William I, Archbishop of Strasbourg, he went on a pilgrimage to Jerusalem about 1040.

Having completed his education, he taught for some time at the cathedral school of Speyer in Rhenish Franconia. In 1047 he became teacher at the Benedictine school of Goslar in Saxony and, shortly after, was made headmaster of the cathedral school at Hildesheim, where he reformed the education at the behest of Bishop Azelin. In Speyer, he had contacted the imperial court of the Salian emperor Henry III. On account of his skill in architecture he was appointed imperial architect and, as such, supervised the construction of numerous castles and churches in the Holy Roman Empire. When the Rhine, which flowed close to the Cathedral of Speyer, threatened to undermine its foundations, Benno saved the structure by changing the course of the river. He and Bishop Azelin of Hildesheim accompanied Henry on a 1051 campaign against King Andrew I of Hungary, whereby Benno distinguished himself in providing the forces' catering. Upon his return he was made provost of Hildesheim, archpriest at Goslar Cathedral and royal vicedominus at the Imperial Palace.

Benno's great talent was also recognized by the emperor's son and successor King Henry IV. Stuck in the rising Saxon conflict, Henry IV strongly relyed on his abilities as a master builder of several castles in the mainland of Saxony, such as the Harzburg finished in 1068. When the ambitious Cologne archbishop Anno II tried to bring him over to his side, the emperor designated him the successor of Bishop Benno I of Osnabrück who had died the past year. Benno did a lot to promote the economic and agricultural development in his diocese, however, when in 1073 Henry's quarrels with the Saxon nobility culminated in open revolt, he had to seek protection at the royal court. He and Archbishop Liemar of Bremen remained close companions of the king, when Henry fled from Saxony and had to consent to the humiliating Treaty of Gerstungen.

During the fierce Investiture Controversy between Pope Gregory VII and Henry IV, Benno for a long time sided with the emperor. He were among the clerics who, led by Archbishop Siegfried of Mainz, declared Gregory deposed at the 1076 Synod of Worms. Benno, like numerous other German and Italian bishops, signed the formula of deposition and incurred ecclesiastical excommunication a few weeks later. With some other excommunicated bishops, Benno hastened to Italy, where the pope freed them from the ban at Canossa Castle. He successfully arbitrated between the adversaries, before Henry himself arrived here to do penance on his Walk to Canossa.

However, the tranquility did not last long. In March 1077 several princes elected Rudolf of Rheinfelden antiking and in 1080 Pope Gregory again excommunicated Henry and all his supporters. While Rudolf was killed in the Battle on the Elster, Benno and several bishops met in a synod at Brixen, where Gregory was again declared deposed and Archbishop Guibert of Ravenna was elected antipope. In turn, Hermann of Salm was elected antiking and Benno's diocesan territories were devastated by the insurgents. With Archbishop Liemar of Bremen he commissioned the anti-papal polemic by the Osnabrück canon Wido, around 1085. (However, he did not author the Gesta Romanae ecclesiae contra Hildebrandum of Cardinal Beno.) On the other hand, Benno tried to bring about a reconciliation, winning over rebellious nobles such as Margrave Egbert II of Meissen and even negotiating with the Roman Curia while the troops of Henry IV laid siege to the pope in the Castel Sant'Angelo.

Upon Gregory's death at Salerno in 1085, Benno retired to the monastery at Iburg Castle near Osnabrück, which he had founded in 1080. In a little house near the monastery he lived according to the rule of the monks during the week, while on Sundays and holidays he assisted at his cathedral in Osnabrück. He died at Iburg three years later.

== Legacy ==
From humble origins, Benno made a remarkable career, not only because his abilities were needed and appreciated, but also due to his social skills and his beneficial relations. However, his close ties with ecclesiastical and secular authorities imposed considerable difficulties during the fierce conflict between the church and state that overshadowed his lifetime.

Strunck and Heitemeyer include him in the list of saints. Kerler says that he is invoked against grasshoppers, because he once dispersed them by his prayers.

== Notes ==
Benno II of Osnabrück Born: c. 1020 Died: 27 July 1088
Catholic Church titles
Preceded by Benno I	Bishop of Osnabrück; 1068–1088	Succeeded by Marquard of Corvey
