= List of Prussian royal consorts =

Royal consorts of Prussia

The Queen of Prussia (German: Königin von Preußen) was the queen consort of the ruler of the Kingdom of Prussia, from its establishment in 1701 to its abolition in 1918. As all rulers of Prussia had to be male, there was never a Queen regnant of Prussia. Until 1806, the Queen of Prussia was also Electress of Brandenburg; after 1871, she was also German Empress. Until 1772, her title was Queen in Prussia (see King in Prussia).

== Duchess of Prussia ==
Picture	Name	Father	Birth	Marriage	Became Duchess	Ceased to be Duchess	Death	Spouse
	Dorothea of Denmark	Frederick I of Denmark (Oldenburg)	1 August 1504	1 July 1526		11 April 1547		Albert I
	Anna Marie of Brunswick-Calenberg-Göttingen	Eric I, Duke of Brunswick-Lüneburg (Welf)	23 April 1532	26 February 1550		20 March 1568 husband's death	20/21 March 1568	Albert I
	Marie Eleonore of Cleves	William, Duke of Jülich-Cleves-Berg (Berg)	25 June 1550	14 October 1573		1 June 1608		Albert II Frederick
	Anna of Prussia	Albert Frederick, Duke of Prussia (Hohenzollern)	3 July 1576	30 October 1594	28 August 1618 husband's accession	23 December 1619 husband's death	30 August 1625	John Sigismund
	Elizabeth Charlotte of the Palatinate	Frederick IV, Elector Palatine (Palatinate-Simmern)	19 November 1597	24 July 1616	23 December 1619 husband's accession	1 December 1640 husband's death	26 April 1660	George William
	Louise Henriette of Orange-Nassau	Frederick Henry, Prince of Orange (Orange-Nassau)	7 December 1627	7 December 1646		18 June 1667		Frederick William
	Sophia Dorothea of Schleswig-Holstein	Philip, Duke of Schleswig-Holstein (Schleswig-Holstein-Sonderburg-Glücksburg)	28 September 1636	13 June 1668		29 April 1688 husband's death	6 August 1689	Frederick William
	Sophia Charlotte of Hanover	Ernest Augustus, Elector of Hanover (Hanover)	30 October 1668	8 October 1684	29 April 1688 husband's accession	18 January 1701 became Queen	1 February 1705	Frederick

== Queens in Prussia ==
Picture	Name	Father	Birth	Marriage	Became Queen	Ceased to be Queen	Death	Spouse
	Sophia Charlotte of Hanover	Ernest Augustus, Elector of Hanover (Hanover)	30 October 1668	8 October 1684	18 January 1701 elevated from Duchess	1 February 1705		Frederick I
	Sophia Louise of Mecklenburg-Schwerin	Frederick, Duke of Mecklenburg-Grabow (Mecklenburg-Schwerin)	6 May 1685	28 November 1708		25 February 1713 husband's death	29 July 1735	Frederick I
	Sophia Dorothea of Hanover	George I of Great Britain (Hanover)	16 March 1687	28 November 1706	25 February 1713 husband's accession	31 May 1740 husband's death	28 June 1757	Frederick William I
	Elisabeth Christine of Brunswick-Bevern	Ferdinand Albert II, Duke of Brunswick-Lüneburg (Brunswick-Bevern)	8 November 1715	12 June 1733	31 May 1740 husband's accession	19 February 1772 ceased to be Queen in Prussia	13 January 1797	Frederick II

== Queens of Prussia ==
Picture	Name	Father	Birth	Marriage	Became Queen	Ceased to be Queen	Death	Spouse
	Elisabeth Christine of Brunswick-Bevern	Ferdinand Albert II, Duke of Brunswick-Lüneburg (Brunswick-Bevern)	8 November 1715	12 June 1733	19 February 1772 became Queen of Prussia	17 August 1786 husband's death	13 January 1797	Frederick II
	Frederika Louisa of Hesse-Darmstadt	Louis IX, Landgrave of Hesse-Darmstadt (Hesse-Darmstadt)	16 October 1751	14 July 1769	17 August 1786 husband's accession	16 November 1797 husband's death	25 February 1805	Frederick William II
	Louise of Mecklenburg-Strelitz	Charles II, Grand Duke of Mecklenburg-Strelitz (Mecklenburg-Strelitz)	10 March 1776	24 December 1793	16 November 1797 husband's accession	9 July 1810		Frederick William III
	Elisabeth Ludovika of Bavaria	Maximilian I Joseph of Bavaria (Wittelsbach)	13 November 1801	29 November 1823	7 June 1840 husband's accession	2 January 1861 husband's death	14 December 1873	Frederick William IV
	Augusta of Saxe-Weimar-Eisenach	Charles Frederick, Grand Duke of Saxe-Weimar-Eisenach (Saxe-Weimar-Eisenach)	30 September 1811	11 June 1829	2 January 1861 husband's accession	9 March 1888 husband's death	7 January 1890	William I
	Victoria of the United Kingdom	Albert, Prince Consort of the United Kingdom (Saxe-Coburg and Gotha)	21 November 1840	25 January 1858	9 March 1888 husband's accession	15 June 1888 husband's death	5 August 1901	Frederick III
	Augusta Viktoria of Schleswig-Holstein	Frederick VIII, Duke of Schleswig-Holstein (Schleswig-Holstein-Sonderburg-Augustenburg)	22 October 1858	27 February 1881	15 June 1888 husband's accession	9 November 1918 husband's abdication	11 April 1921	William II

== See also ==
- List of consorts of Brandenburg
- List of German queens
- Princess of Orange
- Princess of Neuchâtel
- Duchess of Saxe-Lauenburg
- Grand Duchess of Posen
- List of monarchs of Prussia
