= Iburg Castle =

Castle and Benedictine abbey in Bad Iburg, Germany

- Schloss Iburg
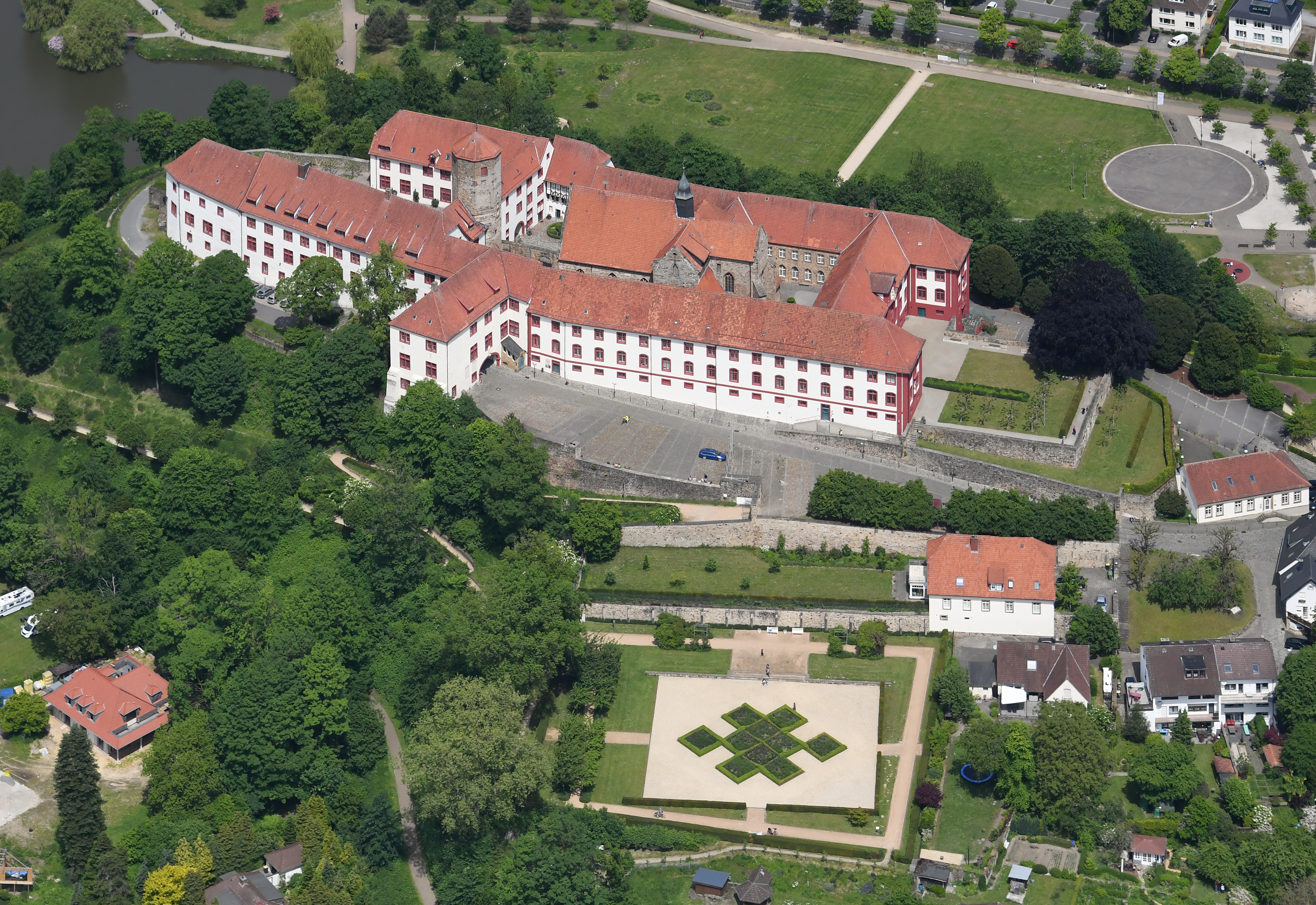
- Iburg Castle

- Location within Lower Saxony Location within Germany

Religion
- Affiliation: Catholic
- Sect: Benedictines

Location
- Location: Bad Iburg, Germany
- Country: Germany
- Interactive map of Iburg Castle
- Coordinates: 52.1578°N 8.0424°E

Architecture
- Completed: 1100

The so-called Iburg Castle (German: Schloss Iburg), is a castle and former Benedictine abbey in Bad Iburg, Germany.

From ca. 1100 till 1673 it was the seat of the Prince-Bishopric of Osnabrück. It is also notable as the birthplace of Sophia Charlotte of Hanover, Queen consort in Prussia.
