= Sophia Charlotte of Hanover =

Duchess/Queen in Prussia from 1688 to 1705

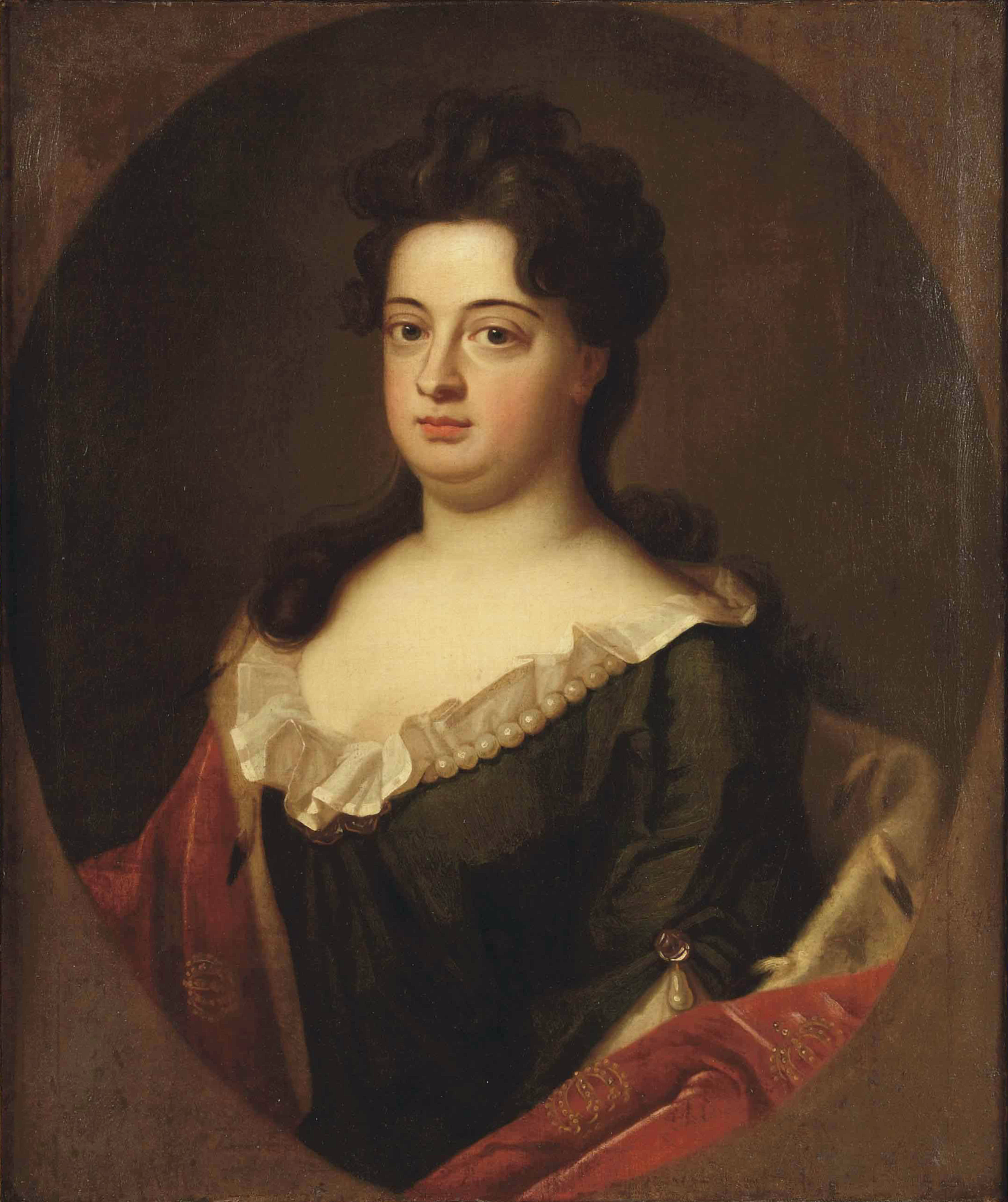
- Portrait by Godfrey Kneller

Duchess/Queen consort in Prussia Electress consort of Brandenburg
- Tenure: 29 April 1688 – 1 February 1705
- Coronation: 18 January 1701; Schlosskirche, Königsberg
- Born: 30 October 1668; Iburg Castle, Osnabrück, Hanover.
- Died: 1 February 1705 (aged 36); Hanover, Brunswick-Lüneburg
- Burial: Berlin Cathedral
- Spouse: Frederick I of Prussia (m. 1684)
- Issue: Prince Frederick August; Frederick William I of Prussia
- House: Hanover
- Father: Ernest Augustus, Elector of Hanover
- Mother: Sophia of the Palatinate

Sophia Charlotte of Hanover (30 October 1668 – 1 February 1705) was the first Queen consort in Prussia as the wife of King Frederick I. She was the only daughter of Elector Ernest Augustus of Hanover and Sophia of the Palatinate. Her eldest brother, George Louis, succeeded to the British throne in 1714 as King George I.

== Early life ==
Sophia Charlotte of Hanover was born on 30 October 1668 in Iburg Castle in the Prince-Bishopric of Osnabrück, where her father held the title of a Protestant prince-bishop. In 1672 her family moved to the new episcopal residence in Osnabrück and finally in 1679 to Hanover, when Ernest Augustus succeeded his brother Duke John Frederick of Brunswick-Lüneburg in the Principality of Calenberg.

During her childhood, Sophia Charlotte visited the Kingdom of France with her mother in hopes of marrying Louis, Grand Dauphin, heir to the French throne. He later married Duchess Maria Anna Victoria of Bavaria instead, but Sophia Charlotte was also proposed as a possible bride for Louis's father, King Louis XIV, after his wife died in 1683. Nothing came of this plan either. A marriage was therefore arranged to Frederick of Hohenzollern, son of Frederick William, Elector of Brandenburg, and heir of both the Margraviate of Brandenburg and the Duchy of Prussia.

== Electress and queen ==
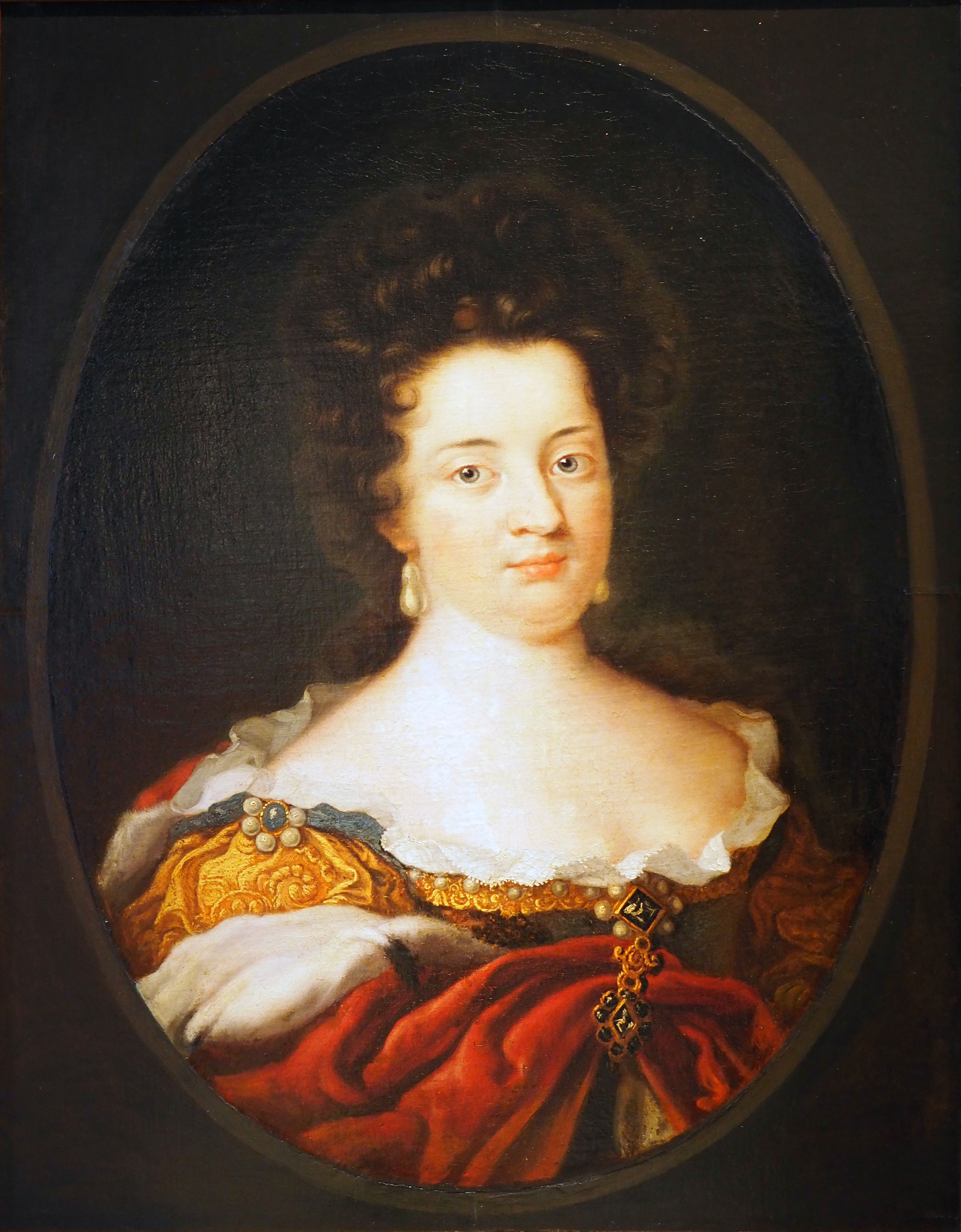
Sophia Charlotte in 1685

Charlottenburg Palace, the royal residence of the Hohenzollern family in Berlin (finished 1713)

By marrying Frederick on 8 October 1684, she became Electress of Brandenburg in 1688, and after the elevation of Brandenburg-Prussia to a kingdom in 1701, she became the first Queen in Prussia. Her only child to reach maturity became King Frederick William I of Prussia. Her husband was so much in love with her that while he had an official mistress, Catharina Rickert, at his palace – in imitation of Louis XIV – he never made use of her services; however, his love for Sophia Charlotte was not reciprocated.

Initially, Sophia Charlotte interfered in political affairs, pushing the downfall of the Prussian prime minister Eberhard von Danckelman in 1697, but soon retired to private life. In 1695, she had received the estates of Lietzow manor west of Berlin from her husband in exchange for further away Caputh. Here she had a Baroque summer residence erected by the architects Johann Arnold Nering and Martin Grünberg, in order to live independently from her husband and have her own court. Frederick was only allowed there by invitation, as on 11 July 1699, when she hosted a birthday party for him. From 1700, she regularly lived there in the summer months. Then called Lietzenburg, it was renamed Charlottenburg Palace after her death.

Frederick and Sophia Charlotte became king and queen of Prussia in 1701. The Queen was the daughter of Sophia, Dowager Electress of Hanover, and the sister of George, Elector of Hanover. She was renowned for her intelligence and strong character, and her uncensored and liberal court attracted a great many scholars, including philosopher Gottfried Leibniz. Sophia Charlotte took in Caroline of Ansbach, the daughter of her friend Princess Eleonore Erdmuthe of Saxe-Eisenach. In Sophia Charlotte's sphere, Caroline was exposed to a lively and liberal intellectual environment quite different from anything she had experienced previously. Before she began her education under Sophia Charlotte's care, Caroline had received little formal education; her handwriting remained poor throughout her life. With her lively mind, Caroline developed into a scholar of considerable ability. She and Sophia Charlotte developed a strong relationship in which Caroline was treated as a surrogate daughter; the Queen once declared Berlin was "a desert" without Caroline whenever she left temporarily for Ansbach.

An intelligent and attractive woman, Caroline was much sought after as a bride. Dowager Electress Sophia called her "the most agreeable Princess in Germany". She was considered for the hand of Archduke Charles of Austria, who was a candidate for the throne of Spain and later became Holy Roman Emperor. Charles made official overtures to her in 1703, and the match was encouraged by King Frederick of Prussia. After some consideration, Caroline refused in 1704, as she would not convert from Lutheranism to Catholicism. Early in the following year, Queen Sophia Charlotte died on a visit to her native Hanover. Caroline was devastated, writing to Leibniz, "The calamity has overwhelmed me with grief and sickness, and it is only the hope that I may soon follow her that consoles me." Sophia Charlotte forever changed Caroline's life, and her liberal views continued to influence Caroline all her life.

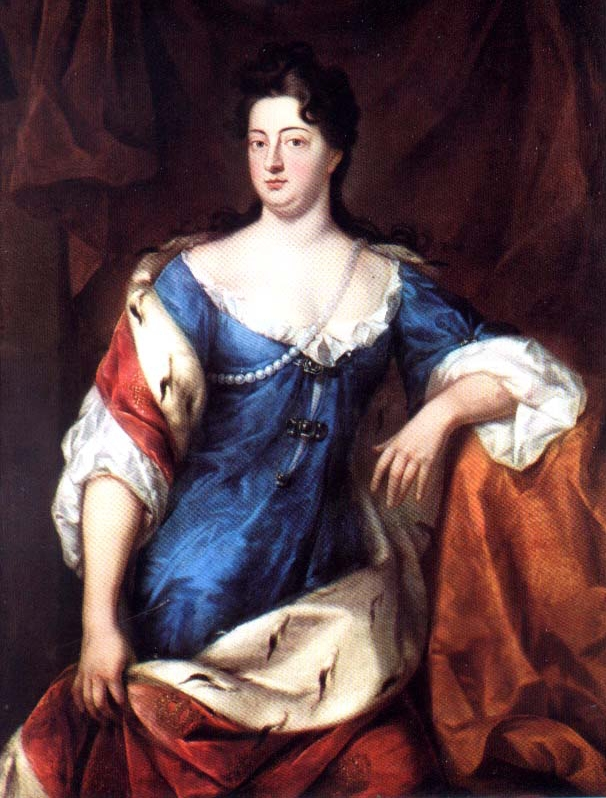
Portrait by Friedrich Wilhelm Weidemann, c. 1702-1705

Sophia Charlotte is mainly remembered for her friendship and correspondence with her mother's good friend and tutor Gottfried Wilhelm Leibniz, whose avowed disciple she became. Leibniz's philosophical work Théodicée is based on his conversation with her. In addition to German, she spoke French, Italian and English fluently. Following the example set by her mother, she surrounded herself with philosophers and theologians like Isaac de Beausobre, Daniel Ernst Jablonski and John Toland and inspired the foundation of the Prussian Academy of Sciences. She was interested in music, sang and played the harpsichord, had an Italian opera theater constructed, and employed the musicians Attilio Ariosti and Giovanni Bononcini. The composer Arcangelo Corelli dedicated his Op. 5 sonatas for solo violin (Rome, 1700) to her. By some reports she disliked her husband's elaborate ceremonies so much that during their coronation she took pinches of snuff to provide herself with "some pleasant distraction". Sophia Charlotte was such a formidable personage that when Tsar Peter the Great first met her and her mother on his Grand Embassy in 1697, he was so overwhelmed and intimidated that he could not speak. Both women put him at ease, and he reciprocated with his natural humour and trunks full of brocade and furs.

While on a visit to her mother in Hanover, Sophia Charlotte died on 1 February [O.S. 21 January] 1705 of pneumonia, at the age of 36. She was buried in Berlin Cathedral.

== Legacy ==
Charlottenburg, today a district of Berlin, the Charlottensee lake in Bad Iburg, as well as the Sophie-Charlotte-Gymnasium in Berlin are named after her.

== Issue ==
1. Frederick August of Brandenburg (6 October 1685 – 31 January 1686) died in infancy.
2. Frederick William I of Prussia (14 August 1688 – 31 May 1740) married Sophia Dorothea of Hanover and had issue.

== Ancestors ==
Ancestors of Sophia Charlotte of Hanover

8. William, Duke of Brunswick-Lüneburg
4. George, Duke of Brunswick-Lüneburg
9. Princess Dorothea of Denmark
2. Ernest Augustus, Elector of Hanover
10. Louis V, Landgrave of Hesse-Darmstadt
5. Landgravine Anne Eleonore of Hesse-Darmstadt
11. Princess Magdalene of Brandenburg
1. Sophia Charlotte of Hanover
12. Frederick IV, Elector Palatine of the Rhine
6. Frederick V, Elector Palatine of the Rhine
13. Countess Louise Juliana of Orange-Nassau
3. Princess Sophia of the Palatinate
14. James I of England and VI of Scotland
7. Princess Elizabeth of England and Scotland
15. Princess Anne of Denmark

Sophia Charlotte of Hanover House of Hanover Cadet branch of the House of Welf Born: 30 October 1668 Died: 1 February 1705
German royalty
Preceded by Sophia Dorothea of Holstein	Duchess consort of Prussia; 29 April 1688 - 18 January 1701	Title abolished Kingdom established
Preceded by Sophia Dorothea of Holstein	Electress consort of Brandenburg; 29 April 1688 – 1 February 1705	Vacant Title next held by Sophia Louise of Mecklenburg-Schwerin
New title	Queen consort in Prussia; 18 January 1701 – 1 February 1705	Vacant Title next held by Sophia Louise of Mecklenburg-Schwerin
