= Christoph Caspar von Blumenthal =

German nobleman and diplomat (1637–1689)

Christoph Caspar von Blumenthal (1637 in Berlin – 1689 in Stavenow) was a German nobleman. He was a career diplomat serving the Great Elector of Brandenburg. He was several times Brandenburg's Ambassador to the Court of Louis XIV.

== Biography ==
He was the son of Baron Joachim Friedrich von Blumenthal and his first wife, Catharina von Klitzing. At the age of 13 he was sent to the Viadrina in 1650, the year his father became the Governor of Halberstadt. In 1653 he accompanied his father to the Diet of Ratisbon. He attended various universities including Leipzig and Helmstedt, before being sent on a grand tour under the supervision of his tutor, Burckhardt Niderstedt. His account of their visit to Malta, Malta Vetus et Nova survives. He returned just after his father's death in 1656, and was invited by the Great Elector to join the Privy Council, aged only 20. In 1660 he was sent on a diplomatic mission to France and Spain, tasked with the heavy responsibility of confirming Brandenburg's interests in the Treaty of Oliva. On his return, he married Louise Hedwig, daughter of Otto von Schwerin, President of the Privy Council. In 1662 he was the youngest ever delegate to the Imperial Diet. In 1663 he was sent as Brandenburg's ambassador to Paris, where he fell sick and went to London from August that year to recuperate. He was accredited to the court of Louis XIV again in 1666 and then was sent to Vienna before returning in 1668 to negotiate over the Polish succession. He died Sept. 16, 1689

In 1672 he negotiated unsuccessfully with the Elector of Trier for safe passage for Brandenburg's troops over the Rhine.

From the 1680s he fell from favour with the Great Elector and retired to his estates. He remained in the Privy Council and became Commander of the Supplinburg Commandery of the Order of St. John. At the Great Elector's funeral he carried the Great Seal.
