= Princess Dorothea Sophie of Schleswig-Holstein-Sonderburg-Glücksburg =

Duchess consort of Prussia (1636–1689)

Princess Dorothea of Schleswig-Holstein-Sonderburg-Glücksburg
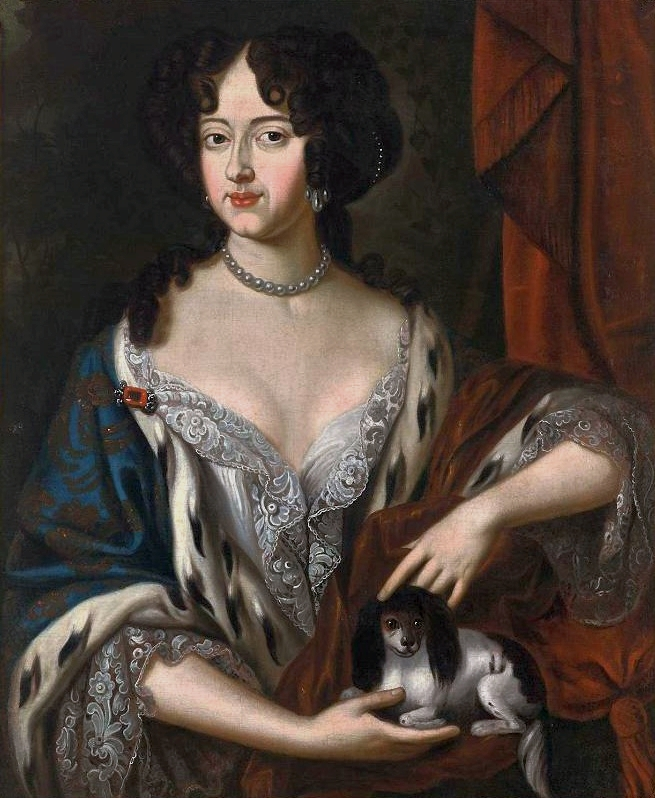

Duchess consort of Prussia Electress consort of Brandenburg
- Tenure: 14 June 1668 – 29 April 1688

Duchess consort of Brunswick-Lüneburg
- Tenure: 9 October 1653 – 15 March 1665
- Born: 28 September 1636; Glücksburg
- Died: 6 August 1689 (aged 52); Karlsbad
- Burial: Berlin Cathedral
- Spouse: Christian Louis, Duke of Brunswick-Lüneburg (m. 1653; died 1665) Frederick William, Elector of Brandenburg (m. 1668; died 1688)
- Issue Detail: Philip William, Margrave of Brandenburg-Schwedt; Marie Amelie, Hereditary Princess of Mecklenburg-Güstrow; Prince Margrave Albert Frederick; Prince Charles; Elisabeth Sophie, Duchess of Saxe-Meiningen; Prince Christian Ludwig
- House: Schleswig-Holstein-Sonderburg-Glücksburg
- Father: Philip, Duke of Schleswig-Holstein-Sonderburg-Glücksburg
- Mother: Sophie Hedwig of Saxe-Lauenburg
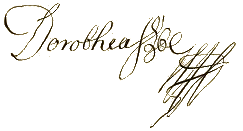
- Signature

Princess Dorothea Sophie of Schleswig-Holstein-Sonderburg-Glücksburg (28 September 1636 – 6 August 1689), was Duchess consort of Brunswick-Lüneburg by marriage to Christian Louis, Duke of Brunswick-Lüneburg, and Electress of Brandenburg by marriage to Frederick William, the Great Elector.

== Biography ==
Dorothea was born in Glücksburg and raised in Glücksburg Castle. She could claim royal blood through her descent from her great-grandfather King Christian III of Denmark, but her parents were of lower rank: Philip, Duke of Schleswig-Holstein-Sonderburg-Glücksburg, and Sophia Hedwig of Saxe-Lauenburg. She was the sister of Auguste of Schleswig-Holstein-Sonderburg-Glücksburg, the duchess of Augustenborg (named after her) by marriage.

=== Duchess of Brunswick-Lüneburg ===
In 1653, Dorothea married Christian Louis, Duke of Brunswick-Lüneburg, brother-in-law of King Frederick III of Denmark. They lived at Celle Castle. Her husband was considered hot-tempered and a drunkard. The marriage was childless. In 1665, her first spouse died, and she moved to Herzberg Castle as a widow's seat while her brother-in-law George William followed him as the reigning Duke of Luneburg in Celle.

=== Electress of Brandenburg ===
On 14 June 1668, she married again, at age 31, this time Frederick William, Elector of Brandenburg, a widower himself, with whom she had seven children. Out of love for her second husband, she switched from the Lutheran to the Calvinist denomination. Asked by the (lutheran) Prussian Estates about her religious convictions, she gave them a detailed "Confession of Faith" in early 1669, which began with the sentence: "I do not believe what the Pope orders, not even in all the parts that Luther, Zwingli, Beza and Calvin write (...)." She courageously advocated religious tolerance: "(I) leave (...) everyone the freedom of conscience (...)."

Dorothea was a self-confident, brave and enterprising woman. She accompanied her husband on all his campaigns, slept on the battlefields and, as an equal, had a great influence on his politics. He discussed all his plans for the state with her. In that respect she resembled his first wife Luise Henriette of Nassau. In order to ensure the financial support of her four sons, while his son by his first marriage, Frederick I of Prussia, was to inherit the throne, she purchased the fief of Brandenburg-Schwedt in 1670 and enlarged it by the fief of Wildenbruch in 1680. She also had both castles, Schwedt and Wildenbruch, rebuilt after she made efforts to revitalize these large estates economically.

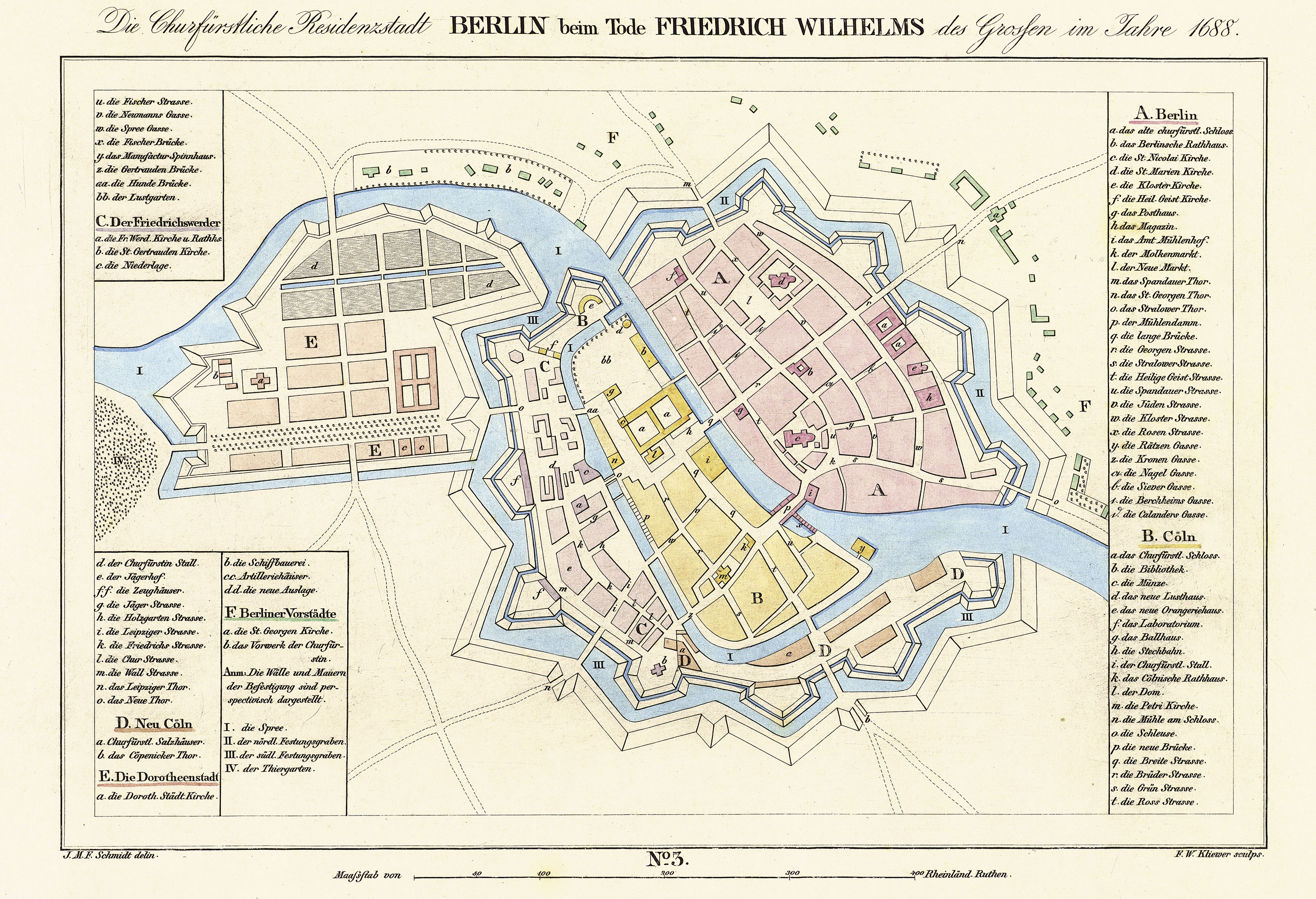
Dorotheenstadt (marked with „E“), 1688

In 1670, she also received an area outside the gates of the then cities of Berlin and Cölln as a gift from her husband. From 1674, a new suburb was planned there, later named after her: Dorotheenstadt.

She had the site parceled out, leased and made substantial profits from the building plots. Dorothea is said to have planted the first tree for the new avenue called Unter den Linden in 1680, an avenue lined with linden trees within her settlement, which had become a kind of artificial island by digging a small canal that complemented the baroque city fortifications (the Berlin Fortress). The tree-lined promenade would later become the magnificent boulevard of Berlin. After the Edict of Potsdam, Huguenots, among others, settled in Dorotheenstadt. She founded a shipyard and a paper mill.

In 1673, the Elector acquired the small Caputh Palace near Potsdam for her, where she had a rural manor house expanded and furnished into her pleasure palace. Today it is a museum of the Prussian Palaces and Gardens Foundation Berlin-Brandenburg, whose exhibition provides information about the life and work of Dorothea. While she herself liked to reside in this small palace, she built a very representative palace complex in Schwedt for her sons.

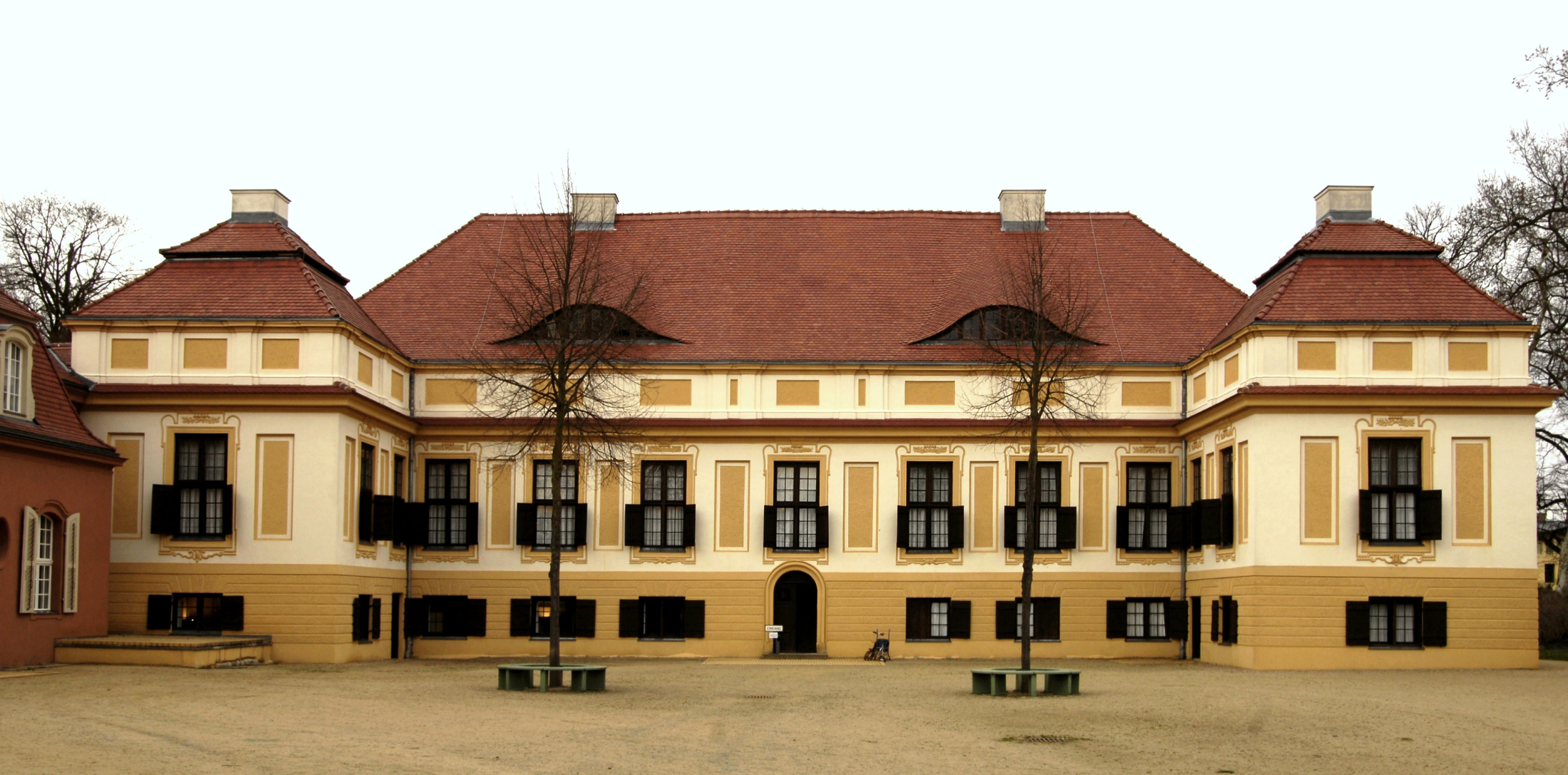
Caputh Palace

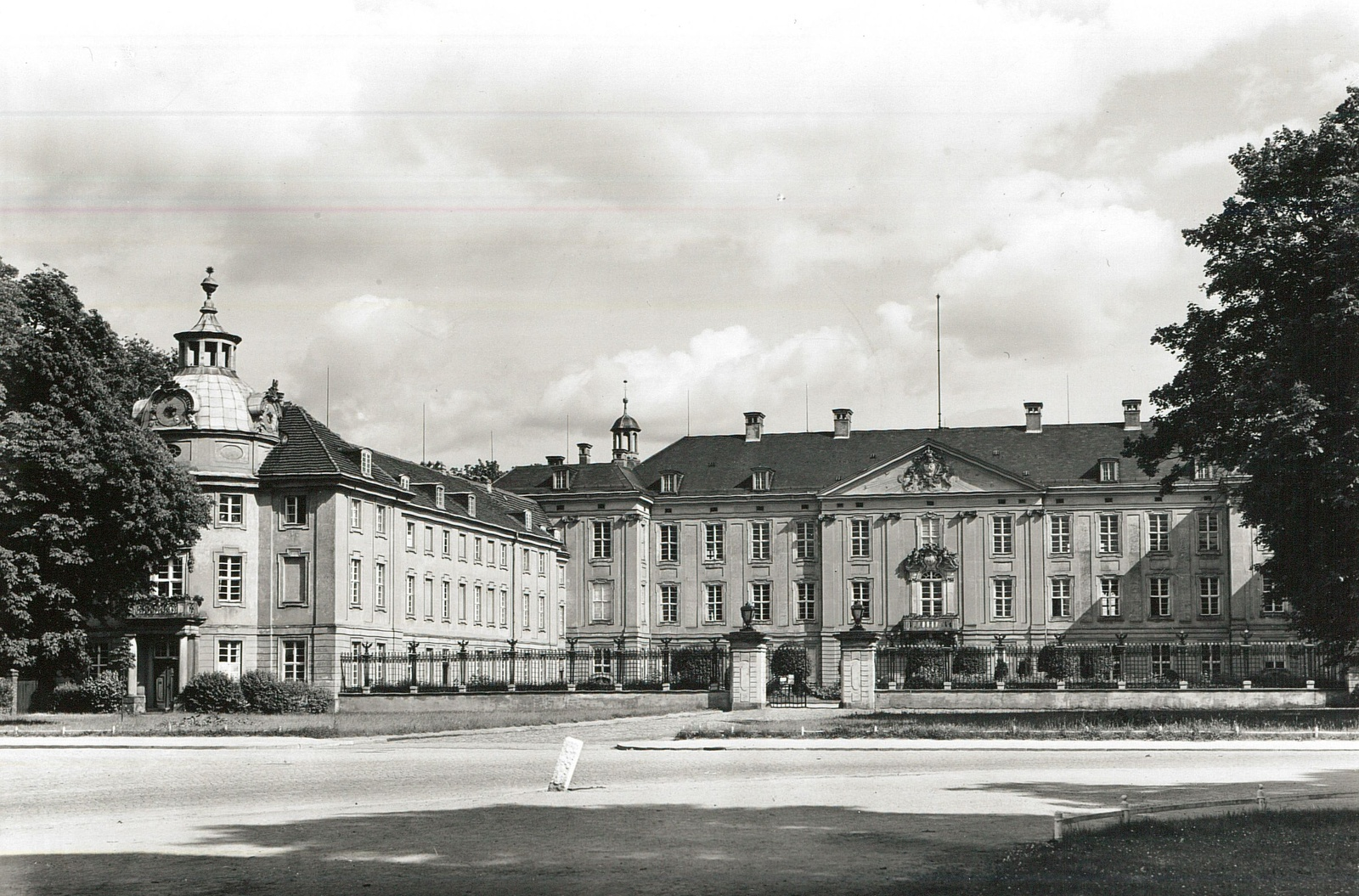
Schwedt Palace

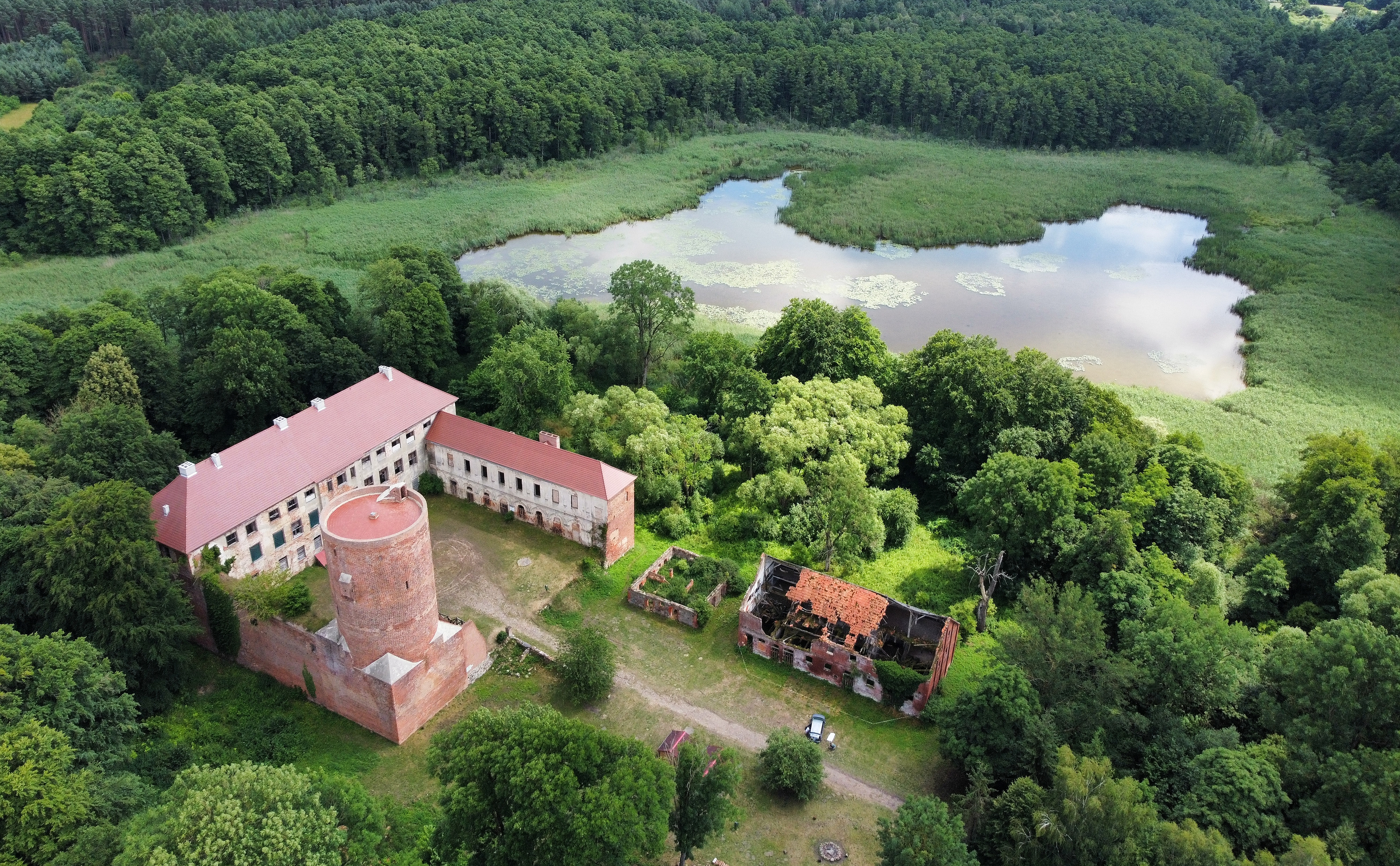
Wildenbruch Castle

In 1676, she became the commander of her own regiment, and in 1678 and 1692 equipped two fleets for the Brandenburg state. In 1684, Fort Dorothea was named after her, the second fort in the Brandenburg Gold Coast colony in south-western modern-day Ghana, after Fort Fredericksburg, that her husband had acquired. Suspicions that Dorothea worked towards a division of Brandenburg-Prussia to secure an income for her sons or even to cobble together states of their own for them is regarded as refuted by historical scholarship, but spoiled her reputation for a long time. This negative perception is based on the fact that some publicists do not base their critical judgments on Dorothea on the primary sources, but on the centuries-old legends that are mainly based on publications after her death, especially by Karl Ludwig von Pöllnitz. Posthumously, the impression was wrongly given that she wanted to make an agreement with France, accepted a division of the country and thus called into question the rise of Prussia to become a great power. There is no question, however, that the Elector's eldest son and successor Frederick I of Prussia harbored at least corresponding fears about his stepmother.

She survived her husband by a year and died in the spa town of Karlsbad in the then Kingdom of Bohemia. She is buried in Berlin Cathedral.

== Issue ==
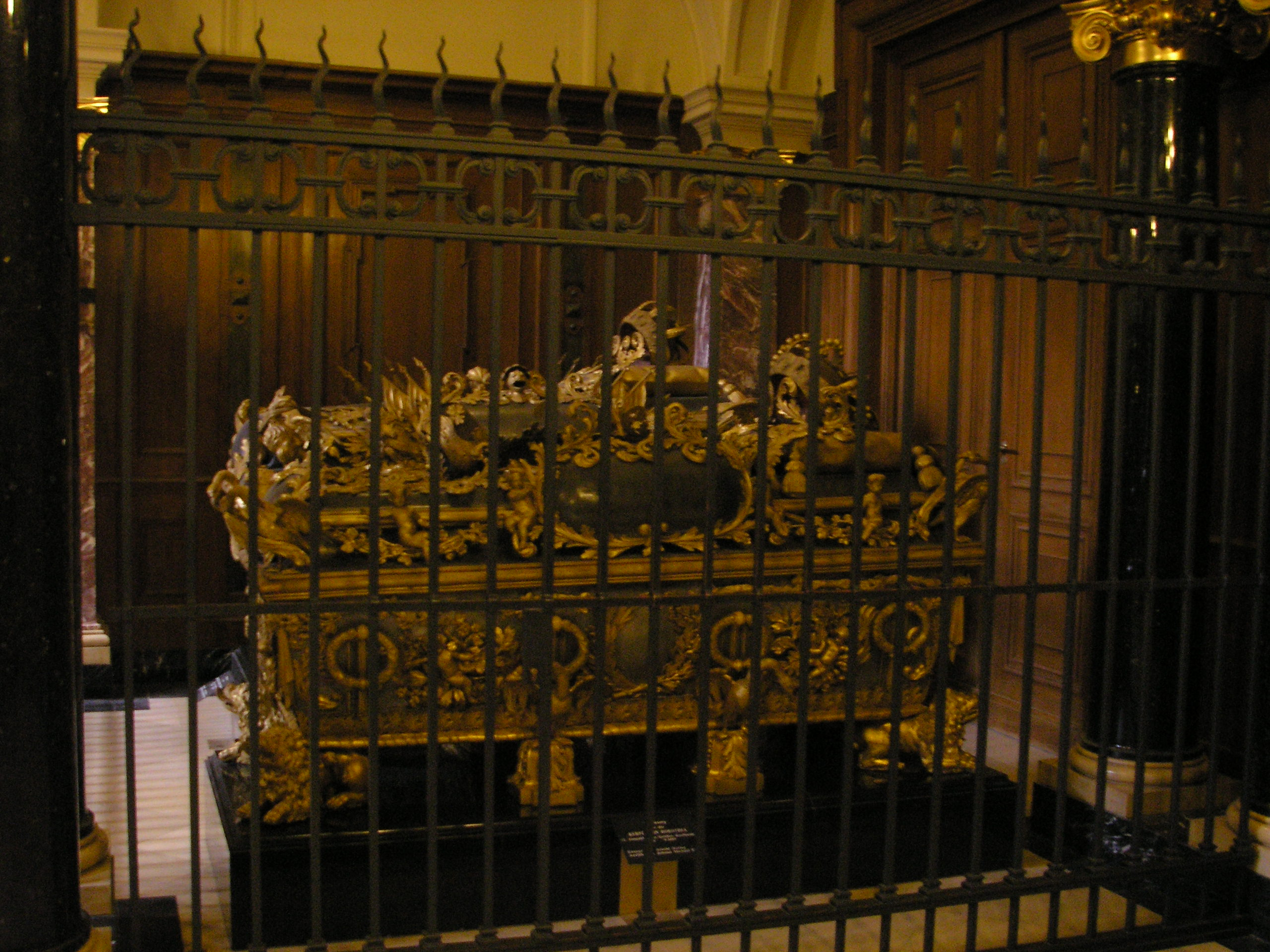
Her tomb at Berlin Cathedral

From her second marriage, Dorothea had the following children:

1. Philip William (1669–1711),
2. Marie Amalie (1670–1739) married:
  1. Charles of Mecklenburg-Güstrow, son of Gustav Adolph, Duke of Mecklenburg-Güstrow
  2. Maurice William, Duke of Saxe-Zeitz, son of Maurice, Duke of Saxe-Zeitz
3. Albert Frederick (1672–1731),
4. Charles Philip (1673–1695),
5. Elisabeth Sofie (1674–1748), who married Christian Ernst of Brandenburg-Bayreuth (6 August 1644 – 20 May 1712) on 30 March 1703.
6. Dorothea (1675–1676),
7. Christian Ludwig (1677–1734), recipient of Bach's Brandenburg Concertos.

== Ancestry ==
Ancestors of Princess Dorothea Sophie of Schleswig-Holstein-Sonderburg-Glücksburg

8. Christian III of Denmark
4. John II, Duke of Schleswig-Holstein-Sonderburg
9. Dorothea of Saxe-Lauenburg
2. Philip, Duke of Schleswig-Holstein-Sonderburg-Glücksburg
10. Ernest III, Duke of Brunswick-Grubenhagen
5. Elisabeth of Brunswick-Grubenhagen
11. Margaret of Pomerania-Wolgast
1. Dorothea of Schleswig-Holstein-Sonderburg-Glücksburg
12. Francis I, Duke of Saxe-Lauenburg
6. Francis II, Duke of Saxe-Lauenburg
13. Sibylle of Saxony
3. Sophie Hedwig of Saxe-Lauenburg
14. Julius, Duke of Brunswick-Lüneburg
7. Maria of Brunswick-Lüneburg
15. Hedwig of Brandenburg

== See also ==
- Sophia Dorothea of Celle

Princess Dorothea Sophie of Schleswig-Holstein-Sonderburg-Glücksburg House of Schleswig-Holstein-Sonderburg-Glücksburg Cadet branch of the House of Oldenburg Born: 28 September 1636 Died: 6 August 1689
German nobility
Vacant Title last held by Luise Henriette of Nassau	Duchess consort of Prussia; 14 June 1668 – 29 April 1688	Succeeded by Sophia Charlotte of Hanover
Vacant Title last held by Luise Henriette of Nassau	Electress consort of Brandenburg; 14 June 1668 – 29 April 1688	Succeeded by Sophia Charlotte of Hanover
Vacant Title last held by Dorothea of Denmark	Duchess of Brunswick-Lüneburg, Princess of Lüneburg; 9 October 1653 – 15 March 1665	Vacant Title next held by Benedicta Henrietta of the Palatinate and Éléonore Desmier d'Olbreuse
Vacant Title last held by Anne Eleonore of Hesse-Darmstadt	Duchess of Brunswick-Lüneburg, Princess of Calenberg and Göttingen; 9 October 1653 – 15 March 1665	Vacant Title next held by Benedicta Henrietta of the Palatinate and Éléonore Desmier d'Olbreuse
