= Countess Louise Henriette of Nassau =

Electress of Brandenburg from 1646 to 1667

Louise Henriette of Nassau
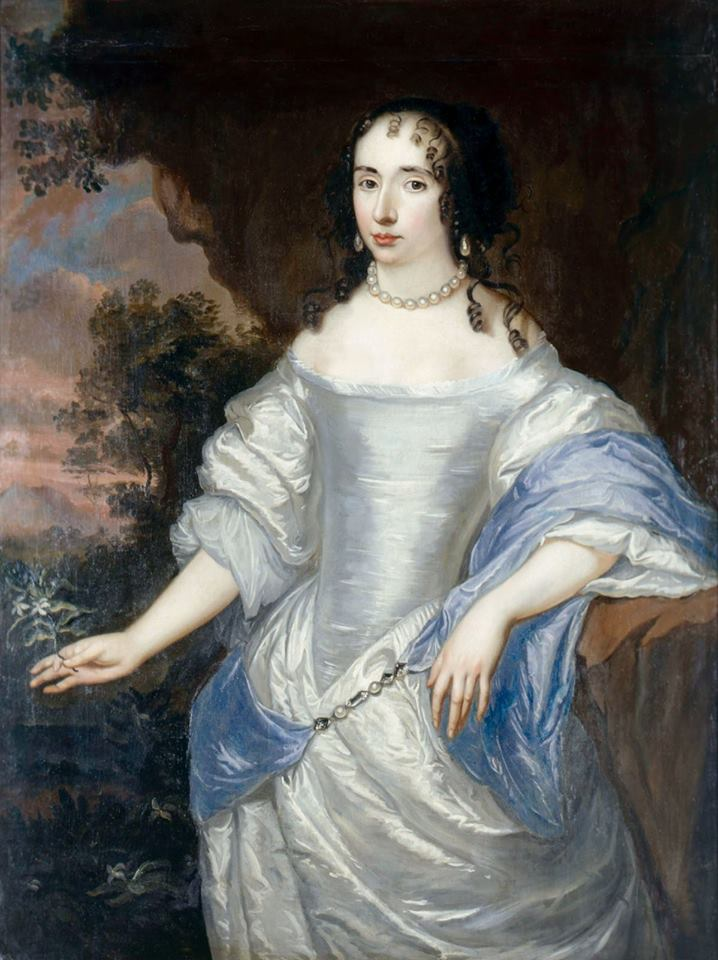
- Portrait attributed to Johannes Mytens

Electress consort of Brandenburg Duchess consort of Prussia
- Tenure: 7 December 1646 – 18 June 1667
- Born: 7 December 1627; The Hague
- Died: 18 June 1667 (aged 39); Cölln
- Burial: Berlin Cathedral
- Spouse: Frederick William, the Great Elector
- Issue Detail: Charles, Electoral Prince of Brandenburg; Frederick I of Prussia; Louis
- House: Orange-Nassau
- Father: Frederick Henry, Prince of Orange
- Mother: Amalia of Solms-Braunfels

Louise Henriette of Nassau (Dutch: Louise Henriëtte van Nassau, German: Luise Henriette von Nassau; 7 December 1627 – 18 June 1667) was a Countess of Nassau, granddaughter of William I, Prince of Orange, "William the Silent", and an Electress of Brandenburg.

== Biography ==
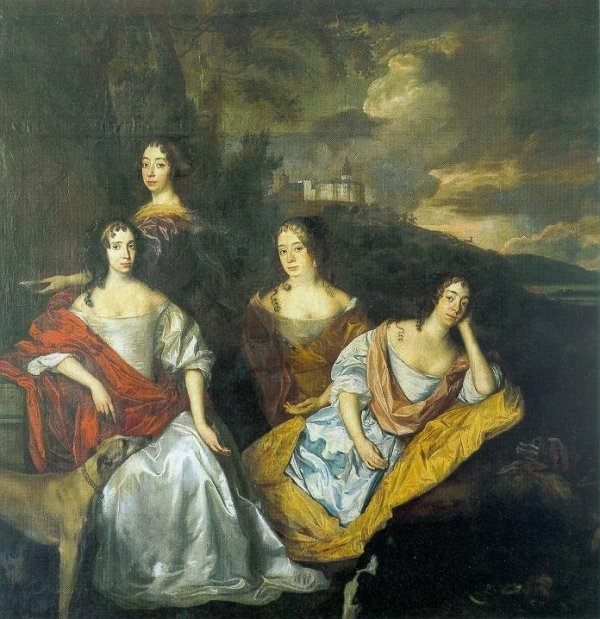
Luise and her sisters

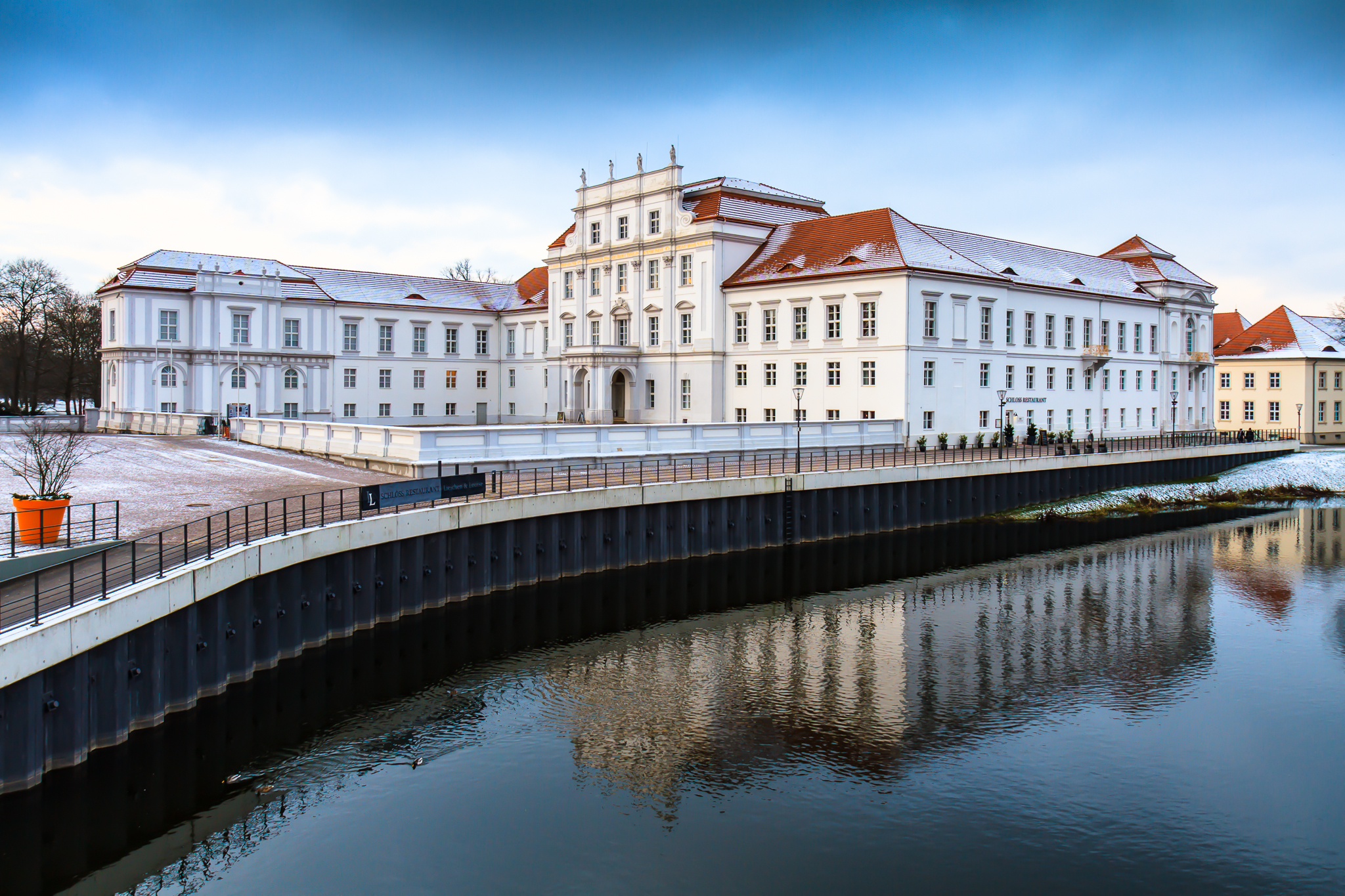
Oranienburg Palace

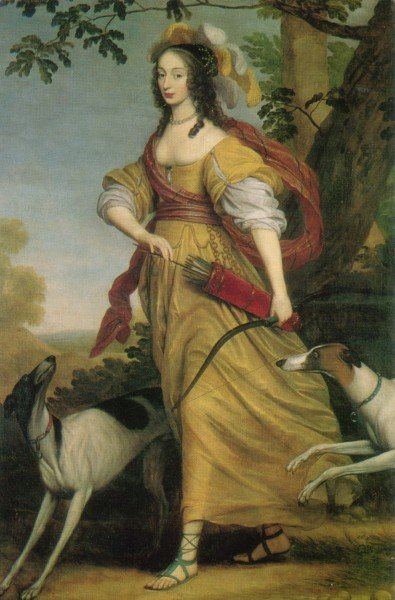
Luise Henriette of Nassau, 1643

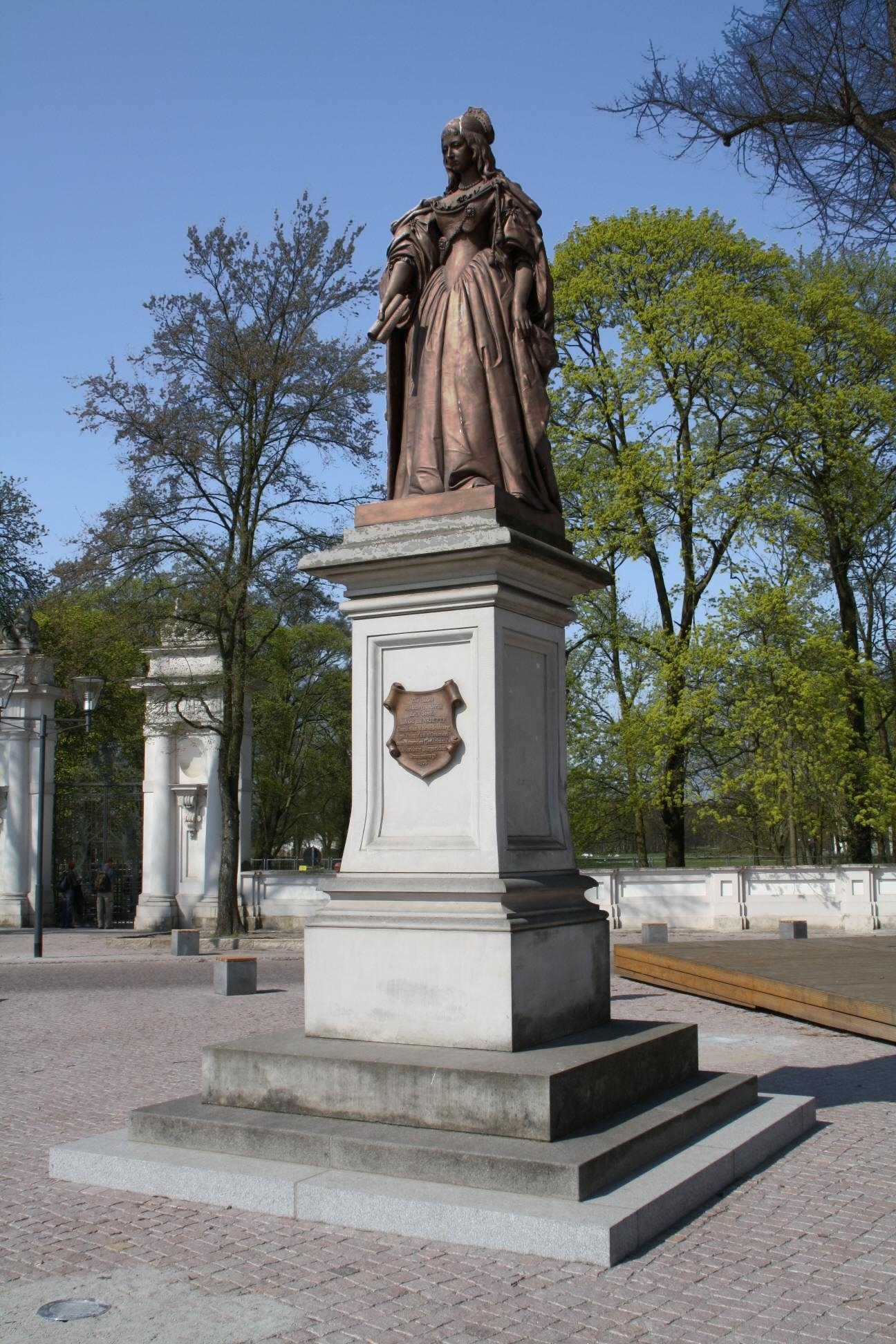
Luise Henriette of Nassau as a statue in Oranienburg

Louise Henriëtte was born in The Hague, the eldest daughter of Frederick Henry, Prince of Orange, and Amalia of Solms-Braunfels. She grew up at the court of her father, the Stadtholder of Holland, Zeeland, Utrecht, Guelders and Overijssel.

=== Marriage ===
Louise Henriëtte had to abandon her love for Henri Charles de La Trémoille, Prince of Talmant, son of Henry de La Trémoille, as her mother had royal ambitions for her. However, attempts to conclude an engagement with King Charles II of England came to nothing. Finally she was forced to marry Frederick William, the Great Elector (1620-1688), "the Great Elector," at The Hague on 7 December 1646, her nineteenth birthday, on the proposal of the Brandenburg diplomat Joachim Friedrich von Blumenthal.

The Electorate of Brandenburg regarded this marriage as beneficial by reason of the connections with the Orange family it created in the hope of obtaining assistance for Brandenburg's struggle for influence in Pomerania.

=== Electress ===
The couple lived in Cleves for the first years of their marriage, but they moved to Brandenburg, Frederick William's seat, in 1648. During her marriage, Louise Henriëtte followed her spouse and traveled between The Hague, Königsberg, Berlin and Cleves on campaigns, inspections, war and battle fields in Poland and Denmark. She acted as her husband's political adviser and was described as a pragmatist. She managed, through correspondence with the Queen of Poland, Marie Louise Gonzaga, to make an alliance with Poland in exchange for the Polish recognition of Prussia as a province of Brandenburg. It was said of her : "Few Electresses had been allowed so much influence".

In 1650 her husband gave her the Amt Bötzow, an electoral domain with large estates and numerous places and farmers that were subject to taxes. Louise Henriëtte had a new castle in Dutch style built in Bötzow in 1650-52 and called it Oranienburg Palace, after her family, the House of Orange-Nassau. It became the name for the entire town in 1653. She was also involved in the design and development of the Lustgarten in Berlin. In 1663, she installed the first porcelain cabinet in Europe. In 1665, she founded an orphanage with places for 24 children.

She was described as truly kind and gentle with a sharp intellect: her advice was vital for her spouse, and their marriage was considered a role model. During time of war, she made great efforts to soften the damages upon society.

A Protestant religious community known as the Luise-Henrietten-Stift in nearby Lehnin Abbey was named after her.

=== Children ===
With Frederick William, the Great Elector, she had six children, only three of whom lived to adulthood:

- William Henry (1648-1649), died in infancy
- Charles (1655-1674)
- Frederick (1657-1713), the first King in Prussia
- Amalie (1664-1665), died in infancy
- Henry (1664-1664), died in infancy
- Louis (1666-1687), married Ludwika Karolina Radziwiłł

Luise Henriette also suffered many miscarriages.

Luise Henriette died in Berlin and was buried in the Berliner Dom.

== Ancestry ==
Ancestors of Countess Louise Henriette of Nassau

8. William I, Count of Nassau-Siegen
4. William the Silent
9. Juliana of Stolberg
2. Frederick Henry, Prince of Orange
10. Gaspard II de Coligny
5. Louise de Coligny
11. Charlotte de Laval
1. Luise Henriette of Nassau
12. Conrad, Count of Solms-Braunfels
6. John Albert I, Count of Solms-Braunfels
13. Elisabeth of Nassau-Dillenburg
3. Amalia of Solms-Braunfels
14. Louis I, Count of Sayn-Wittgenstein
7. Agnes of Sayn-Wittgenstein
15. Elisabeth of Solms-Laubach

Countess Louise Henriette of Nassau House of Orange-Nassau Born: 7 December 1627 Died: 18 June 1667
German nobility
Vacant Title last held by Elizabeth Charlotte of the Palatinate	Electress consort of Brandenburg; 7 December 1646 – 18 June 1667	Vacant Title next held by Sophia Dorothea of Holstein
Vacant Title last held by Elizabeth Charlotte of the Palatinate	Duchess consort of Prussia; 7 December 1646 - 18 June 1667	Vacant Title next held by Sophia Dorothea of Holstein
