= Frederick William, the Great Elector =

Elector of Brandenburg from 1640 to 1688

Frederick William
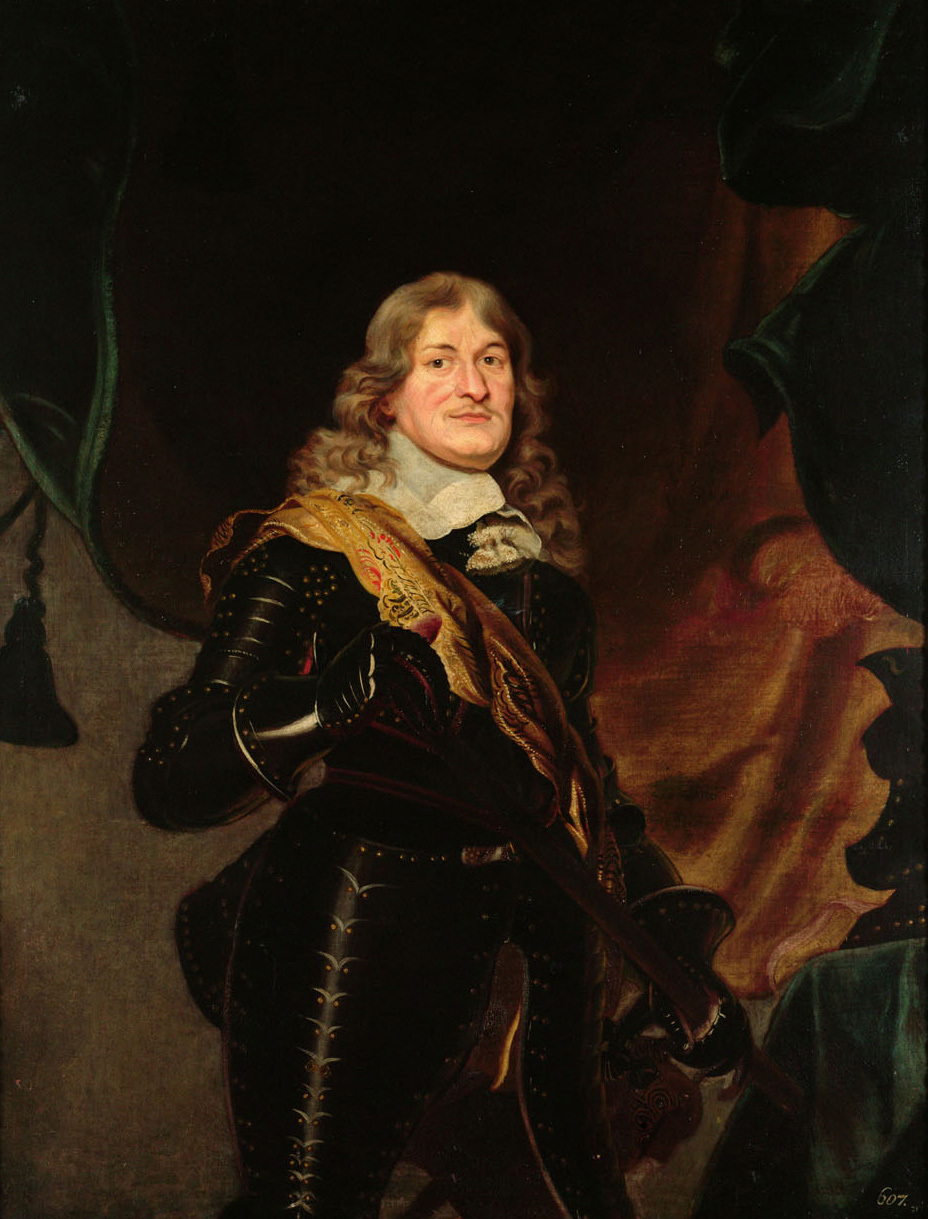
- Portrait by Frans Luycx, c. 1650

Elector of Brandenburg Duke of Prussia
- Reign: 1 December 1640 – 29 April 1688
- Predecessor: George William
- Successor: Frederick III
- Born: 16 February 1620; Stadtschloss, Berlin, Brandenburg-Prussia, Holy Roman Empire
- Died: 29 April 1688 (aged 68); Stadtschloss, Potsdam, Brandenburg-Prussia, Holy Roman Empire
- Burial: Berlin Cathedral
- Spouse: Countess Luise Henriette of Nassau (m. 1646; died 1667) Princess Dorothea Sophie of Schleswig-Holstein-Sonderburg-Glücksburg (m. 1668)
- Issue Detail: Charles, Electoral Prince of Brandenburg; Frederick I, King in Prussia; Philip William, Margrave of Brandenburg-Schwedt; Marie Amelie, Hereditary Princess of Mecklenburg-Güstrow; Margrave Albert Frederick; Margrave Charles; Elisabeth Sophie, Duchess of Saxe-Meiningen; Margrave Christian Ludwig
- House: Hohenzollern
- Father: George William, Elector of Brandenburg
- Mother: Elisabeth Charlotte of the Palatinate
- Religion: Calvinist

Frederick William (German: Friedrich Wilhelm; 16 February 1620 – 29 April 1688) was Elector of Brandenburg and Duke of Prussia, thus ruler of Brandenburg-Prussia, from 1640 until his death in 1688. A member of the House of Hohenzollern, he is popularly known as "the Great Elector" (der Große Kurfürst) because of his military and political achievements. Frederick William was a staunch pillar of the Calvinist faith, associated with the rising commercial class. He saw the importance of trade and promoted it vigorously. His shrewd domestic reforms gave Prussia a strong position in the post-Westphalian political order of Northern-Central Europe, setting up Prussia for elevation from duchy to kingdom, achieved under his son and successor.

== Early life ==
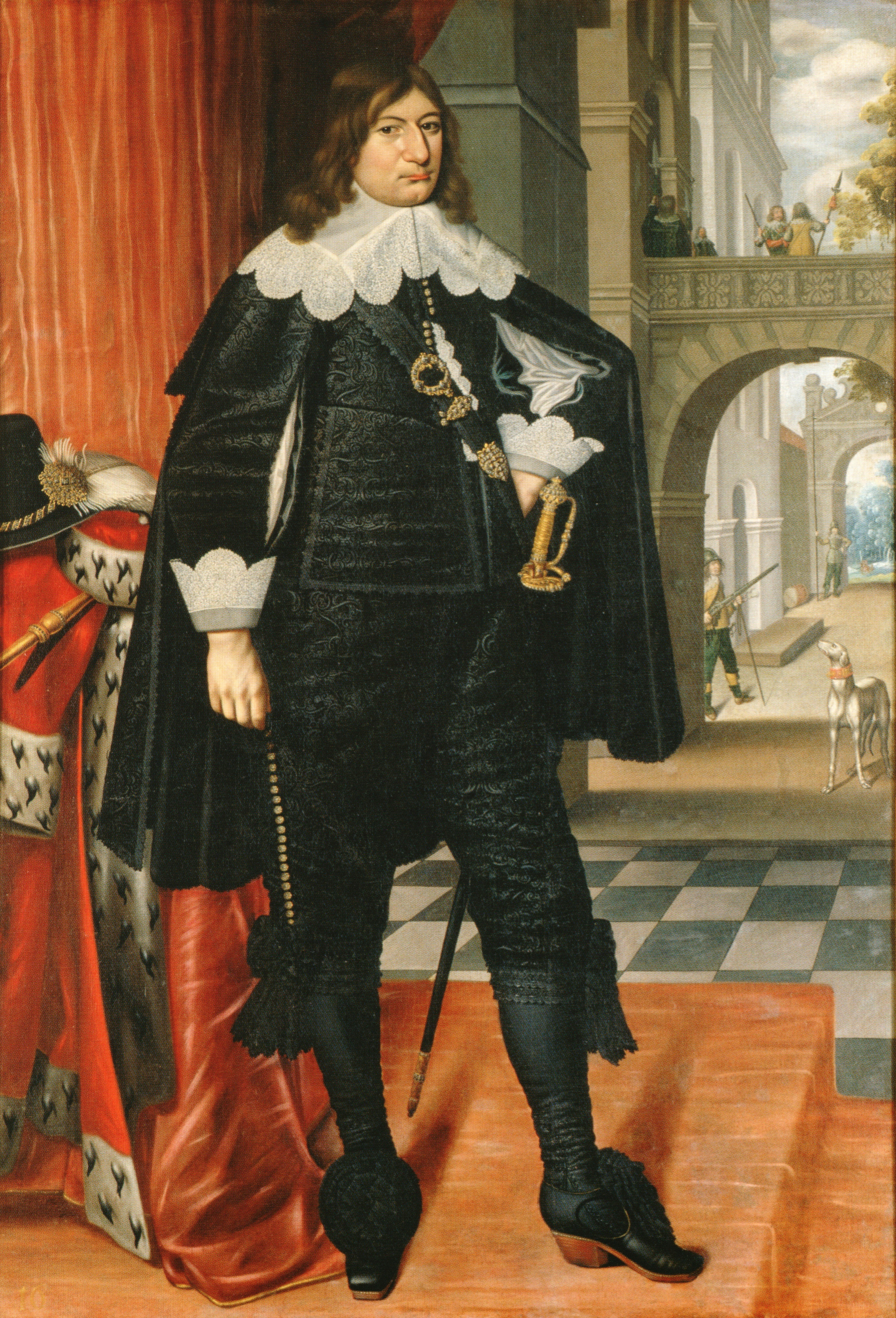
Portrait by Mathias Czwiczek, 1642

Elector Frederick William was born in Berlin to George William, Elector of Brandenburg, and Elisabeth Charlotte of the Palatinate. His inheritance consisted of the Margraviate of Brandenburg, the Duchy of Cleves, the County of Mark, and the Duchy of Prussia.

Owing to the disorder in Brandenburg during the Thirty Years' War, he spent part of his youth in the Netherlands, studying at Leiden University and learning something of war and statecraft under Frederick Henry, Prince of Orange. During his boyhood, a marriage had been suggested between him and Christina, heir to the throne of Sweden, but although the idea was revived during the peace negotiations between Sweden and Brandenburg, it came to nothing.

When his father died in 1640, the 20-year-old's reign as elector began.

== Reign ==
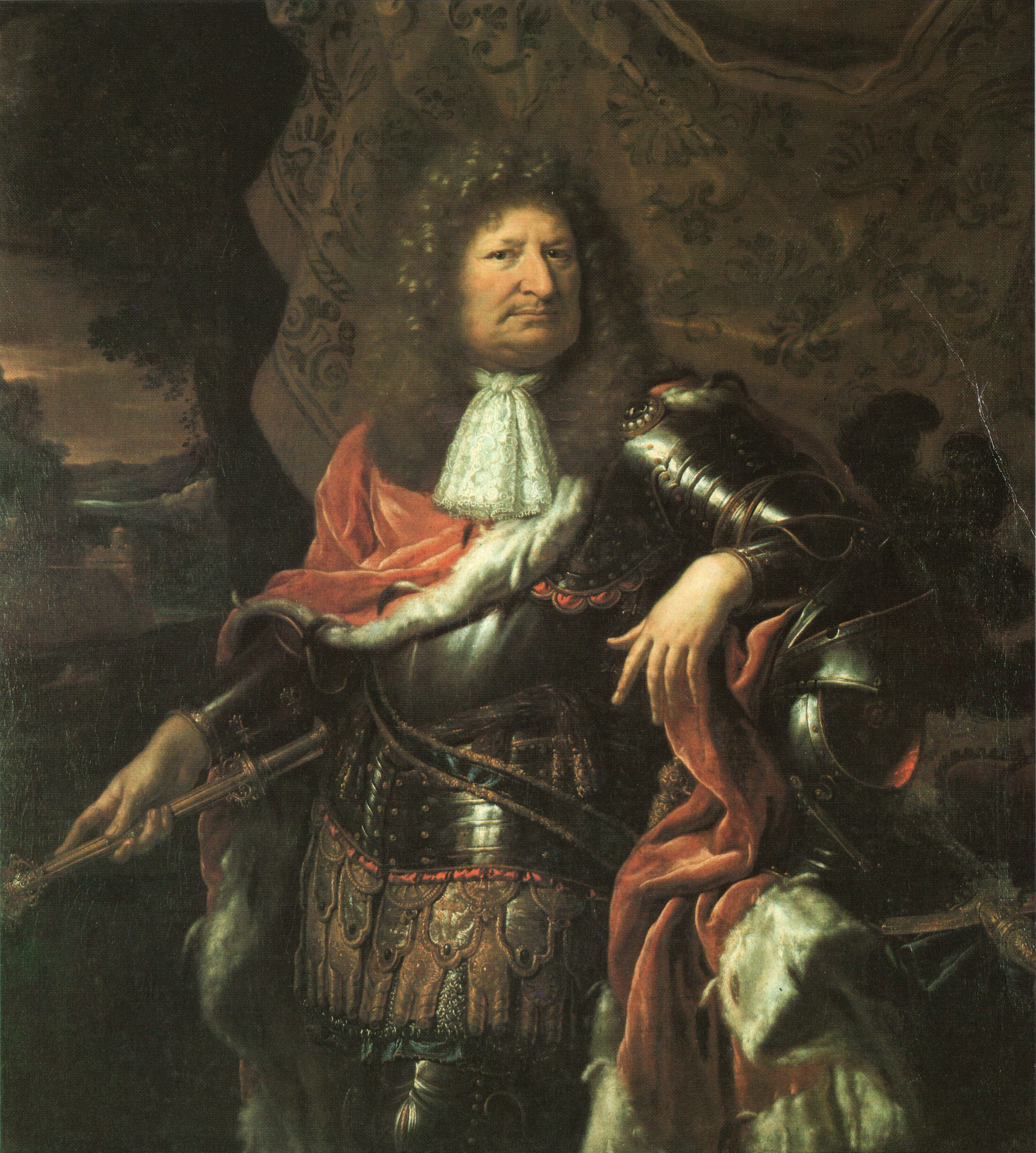
Portrait by Abraham and Gedeon Romandon, 1687–1688

=== Foreign policy ===
Following the Thirty Years' War, which devastated much of the Holy Roman Empire, Frederick William focused on rebuilding his war-ravaged territories. Brandenburg-Prussia benefited from his policy of religious tolerance, and he used French subsidies to build up an army that took part in the 1655 to 1660 Second Northern War. This ended with the treaties of Labiau, Wehlau, Bromberg and Oliva; these changed the status of Ducal Prussia from that of a Polish fief to fully sovereign (after a brief period of control by Sweden). In 1666 his title to the duchies of Cleves and Jülich as well as the County of Ravensberg was definitely recognized.

In 1672, Frederick William joined the Franco-Dutch War as an ally of the Dutch Republic, led by his nephew William of Orange but made peace with France in the June 1673 Treaty of Vossem. Although he rejoined the anti-French alliance in 1674, this left him diplomatically isolated; despite conquering much of Swedish Pomerania during the Scanian War, he was obliged to return most of it to Sweden in the 1679 Treaty of Saint-Germain-en-Laye.

=== Military career ===
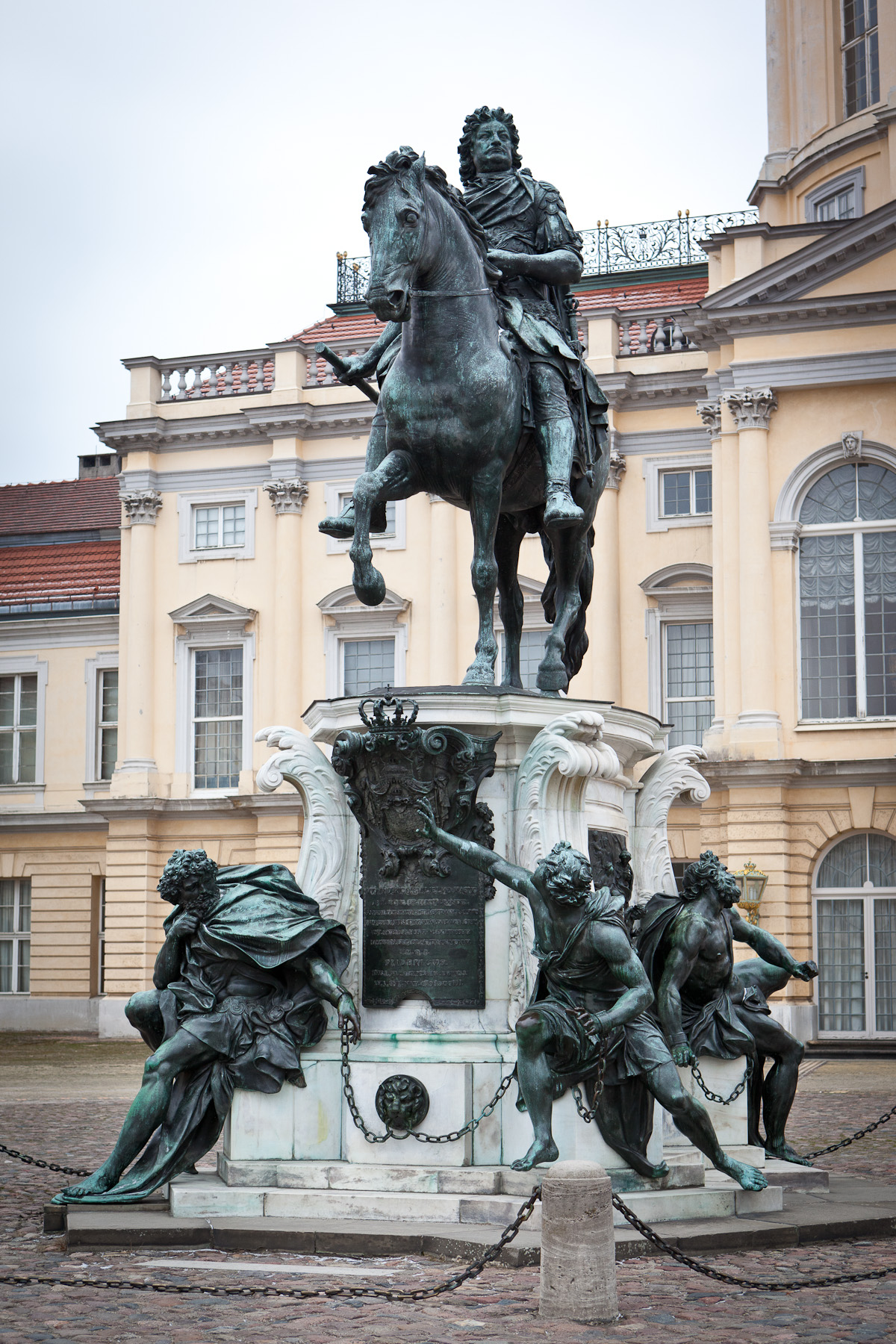
Statue of Frederick William at Charlottenburg Palace, Berlin

Frederick William was a military commander of wide renown, and his standing army would later become the model for the Prussian Army. He is notable for his joint victory with Swedish forces at the Battle of Warsaw, which, according to Hajo Holborn, marked "the beginning of Prussian military history", but the Swedes turned on him at the behest of King Louis XIV and invaded Brandenburg. After marching 250 kilometres in 15 days back to Brandenburg, he caught the Swedes by surprise and managed to defeat them on the field at the Battle of Fehrbellin, destroying the myth of Swedish military invincibility. He later destroyed another Swedish army that invaded the Duchy of Prussia during the Great Sleigh Drive in 1678. In the previous year, he led a successful siege of Stettin against the Swedish garrison. He is noted for his use of broad directives and delegation of decision-making to his commanders, which would later become the basis for the German doctrine of Auftragstaktik, and for using rapid mobility to defeat his foes.

=== Domestic policies ===
Since his capital Berlin had suffered greatly from the Swedish occupation during the Thirty Years' War, Friedrich Wilhelm commissioned the master engineer Johann Gregor Memhardt to plan a city fortification. Construction of the Berlin Fortress began in 1650 following the contemporary fortification model of bastion forts in northern Italy. Large parts were finished between 1658 and 1662, but the last ramparts only in 1683.

Frederick William raised an army of 45,000 soldiers by 1678, through the General War Commissariat presided over by Joachim Friedrich von Blumenthal. He succeeded in his goal of centralizing the administration and increasing the revenue, and was an advocate of mercantilism, monopolies, subsidies, tariffs, and internal improvements. Following Louis XIV's revocation of the Edict of Nantes, Frederick William encouraged skilled French and Walloon Huguenots to emigrate to Brandenburg-Prussia with the Edict of Potsdam, bolstering the country's technical and industrial base. On Blumenthal's advice he agreed to exempt the nobility from taxes and in return they agreed to dissolve the Estates-General. He also simplified travel in Brandenburg and the Duchy of Prussia by connecting riverways with canals, a system that was expanded by later Prussian architects, such as Georg Steenke; the system is still in use today.

== Legacy ==
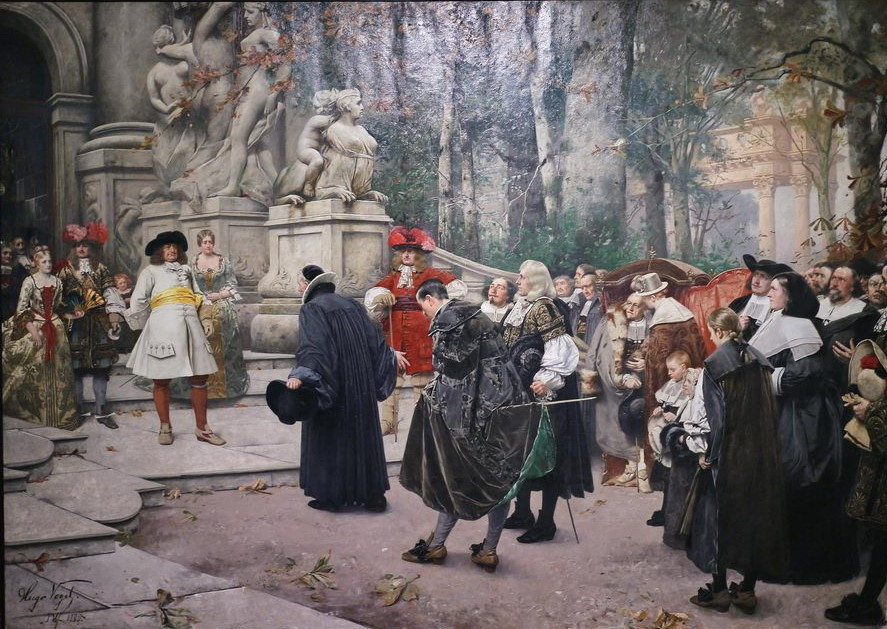
Frederick William welcoming Huguenot refugees at Potsdam City Palace, 1685. Painting by Hugo Vogel, 1885

After the victory at Fehrbellin he was an established name. His great grandson, Frederick II, later said of him with regard to the battle: ”He was praised by his enemies, blessed by his people; and posterity dates from that famous day the subsequent elevation of the house of Brandenburg”.

In his half-century reign, 1640–1688, the Great Elector transformed the small remote state of Prussia into a great power by augmenting and integrating the Hohenzollern family possessions in northern Germany and Prussia. When he became elector (ruler) of Brandenburg in 1640, the country was in ruins from the Thirty Years' War; it had lost half its population from war, disease and emigration. The capital Berlin had only 6,000 people left when the wars ended in 1648. He united the multiple separate domains that his family had acquired primarily by marriage over the decades, and built the powerful unified state of Prussia out of them. His success in rebuilding the lands and his astute military and diplomatic leadership propelled him into the ranks of the prominent rulers in an era of "absolutism". Historians compare him to his contemporaries such as Louis XIV of France (1643–1715), Peter the Great (1682–1725) of Russia, and Charles XI of Sweden (1660–1697).

Although a strict Calvinist who stood ready to form alliances against the Catholic states led by France's Louis XIV, he was tolerant of Catholics and Jews. He settled some 20,000 Huguenot refugees from France in his domains, which helped establish industry and trade, as did the foreign craftsmen he brought in. He established local governments in each province, headed by a governor and a chancellor, but they reported to his central government in Berlin. The Great Elector is most famous for building a strong standing army, with an elite officer corps. In 1668 he introduced the Prussian General Staff; it became the model in controlling an army for other European powers. Funding the military through heavy taxes required building up new industry, such as wool, cotton, linen, lace, soap, paper, and iron. He paid attention to infrastructure, especially building the Frederick William Canal through Berlin, linking his capital city to ocean traffic. He was frustrated in building up naval power, lacking ports and sailors.

In 1682, at the suggestion of the Dutch merchant and privateer Benjamin Raule, he granted a charter to the Brandenburg Africa Company (BAC), marking the first organised and sustained attempt by a German state to take part in the Atlantic slave trade. As Brandenburg-Prussia remained economically impoverished after the Thirty Years War, he hoped to replicate the mercantile successes of the Dutch East India Company. The charter he granted to the BAC stipulated that they could establish a colony in West Africa, which was subsequently named the Brandenburger Gold Coast. Between 17,000 and 30,000 enslaved Africans were transported by the BAC to the Americas before the colony was sold to the Dutch in 1721.

Significant ships named after Frederick William include two Imperial Navy ships of Germany named Grosser Kurfürst: one built in 1875 and the other built in 1913. Shipping company Norddeutscher Lloyd (aka North German Lloyd) also built a cargo and passenger liner for North Atlantic service with the same name that was later taken into a US navy warship

== Marriages and children ==
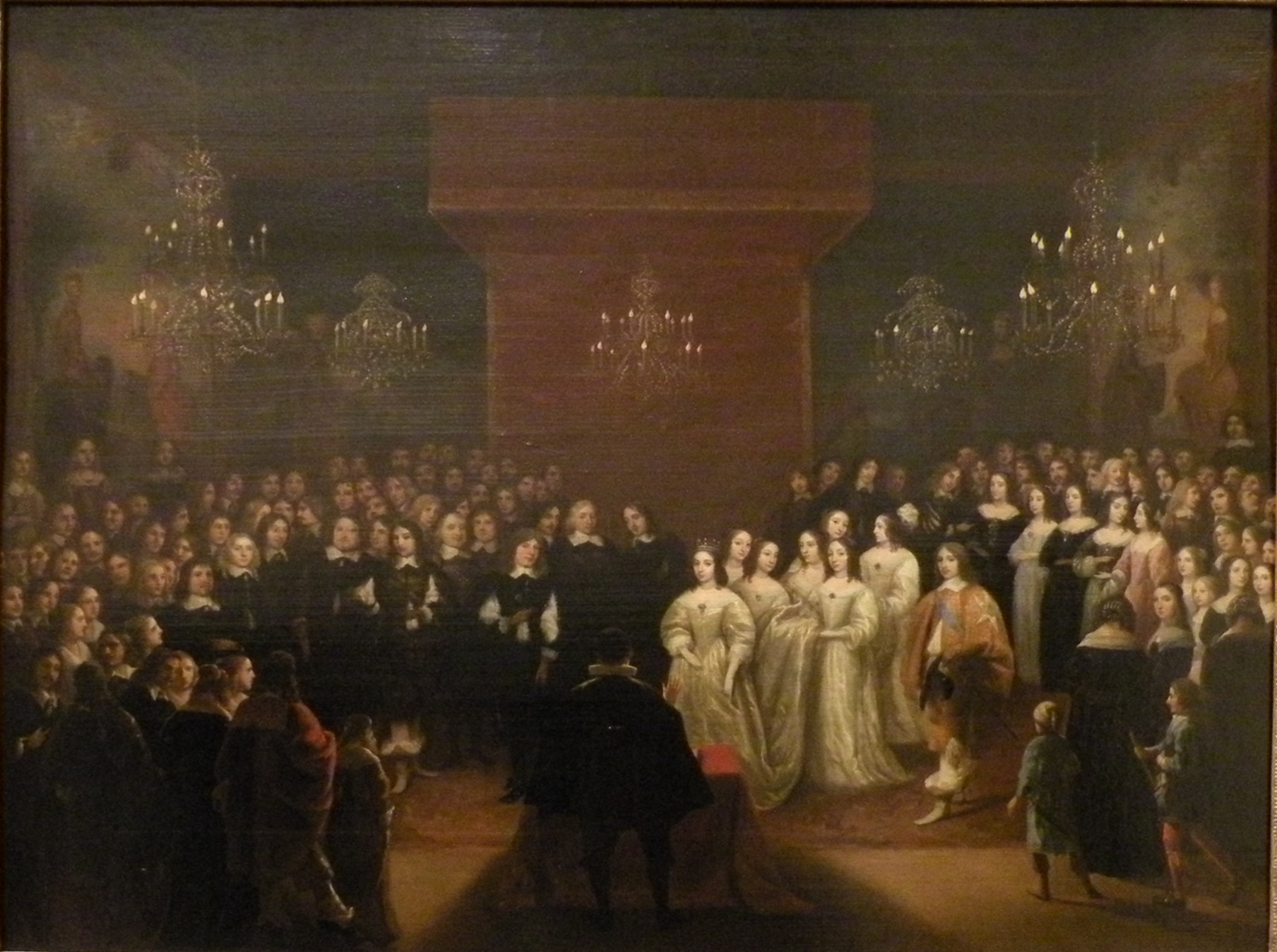
Painting of his 1646 wedding ceremony by Johannes Mytens

On 7 December 1646 in The Hague, Frederick William entered into a marriage, proposed by Blumenthal as a partial solution to the Jülich-Berg question, with Luise Henriette of Nassau (1627–1667), daughter of Frederick Henry of Orange-Nassau and Amalia of Solms-Braunfels and his 1st cousin once removed through William the Silent. Their children were as follows:

1. William Henry, Electoral Prince of Brandenburg (21 May 1648 – 24 October 1649) died young.
2. Charles, Electoral Prince of Brandenburg (1655–1674)
3. Frederick I of Prussia (1657–1713), his successor
4. Amalie (19 November 1664 – 1 February 1665) died in infancy.
5. Henry (19 November 1664 – 26 November 1664) died in infancy.
6. Louis (8 June 1666 – 7 April 1687), who married Ludwika Karolina Radziwiłł, no issue.

On 13 June 1668 in Gröningen, Frederick William married Sophie Dorothea of Holstein-Sonderburg-Glücksburg, daughter of Philip, Duke of Schleswig-Holstein-Sonderburg-Glücksburg and Sophie Hedwig of Saxe-Lauenburg, widow of Christian Louis, Duke of Brunswick-Lüneburg. Their children were the following:

1. Philip William (1669–1711)
2. Marie Amelie (1670–1739)
3. Albert Frederick (1672–1731)
4. Charles Philip (1673–1695)
5. Elisabeth Sofie (1674–1748)
6. Dorothea (6 June 1675 – 11 September 1676) died young.
7. Christian Ludwig (1677–1734)

In both self-confident women he found political advisers who thought and acted pragmatically. Both accompanied him on his campaigns. Luise Henriette also distinguished herself through charity, Sophie Dorothea through extraordinary business acumen, which allowed her to increase both her own fortune (and thus the inheritance of her children) and to strengthen the state economy. Both also left behind impressive palace buildings that they had built on their fiefs from their own income.

The suspicion that Dorothea worked towards a division of Brandenburg-Prussia in order to secure an income for her sons is regarded as refuted by historical scholarship. This negative perception is based on the fact that some publicists do not base their critical judgments on Dorothea on the primary sources, but on the centuries-old legends that are mainly based on publications after her death, especially by Karl Ludwig von Pöllnitz. There is no question, however, that the Elector's eldest surviving son and successor harbored at least corresponding fears about his stepmother.

== Ancestry ==
Ancestors of Frederick William, the Great Elector

8. Joachim Frederick, Elector of Brandenburg
4. John Sigismund, Elector of Brandenburg
9. Margravine Catherine of Brandenburg-Küstrin
2. George William, Elector of Brandenburg
10. Albert Frederick, Duke of Prussia
5. Duchess Anna of Prussia
11. Marie Eleonore of Cleves
1. Frederick William, Elector of Brandenburg
12. Louis VI, Elector Palatine
6. Frederick IV, Elector Palatine
13. Landgravine Elisabeth of Hesse
3. Elizabeth Charlotte of the Palatinate
14. William the Silent; Prince of Orange and Count of Nassau
7. Countess Louise Juliana of Nassau
15. Princess Charlotte of Bourbon

== See also ==
- German colonial projects before 1871#Brandenburg-Prussian colonies

Frederick William, the Great Elector House of Hohenzollern Born: 16 February 1620 Died: 29 April 1688
Regnal titles
Preceded by George William	Elector of Brandenburg; Duke of Prussia; 1640–1688	Succeeded by Frederick III
