= Charles Philip of Brandenburg-Schwedt =

- Born: 5 January 1673; Sparnberg
- Died: 23 July 1695 (aged 22); Casale Monferrato
- Burial: Berlin Cathedral
- Spouse: Countess Catherine Salmour, née Marchesa di Balbiano
- House: House of Hohenzollern
- Father: Frederick William, Elector of Brandenburg
- Mother: Sophia Dorothea of Schleswig-Holstein-Sonderburg-Glücksburg

Margrave Charles Philip of Brandenburg-Schwedt (5 January 1673 in Sparnberg – 23 July 1695 in Casale Monferrato) was a Hohenzollern prince and a titular Margrave of Brandenburg-Schwedt. Near the end of his life he became Grand Master of the Order of Saint John (Bailiwick of Brandenburg).

== Life ==
Charles Philip was the third surviving son of the "Great Elector", Frederick William of Brandenburg (1620–1688) from his second marriage with Sophia Dorothea (1636–1689), the daughter of Philip, Duke of Schleswig-Holstein-Sonderburg-Glücksburg.

In 1693, Charles Philip proved himself at the Battle of Neerwinden and was promoted to Lieutenant General by his brother Frederick I. He participated in the War of the Palatine Succession at the head of an auxiliary contingent. He joined the main force of Victor Amadeus II of Sardinia in Turin.

In Turin, he met Countess Caterina di Salmour (1670-1719), widow of Giovanni Gabaleone, Count di Salmour and daughter of Geofredo Alberico Balbiani, Marchese di Colcavagno by his wife, Marta-Maria Benso di Cavour, heiress of Isolabella. On the afternoon of 29 May 1695 three officers of Brandenburg's army, Col. Ludwig von Blumenthal, Lt. Col. von Hackeborn and Col. von Stille learned that Charles Philipp had lodged in the recently ruined Palace of Venaria, near Turin, where he was about to marry the Countess di Salmour in secret. They hurried towards La Venaria. As they neared the château, the Margrave’s Master of the Horse met them on the road and confirmed the rumour. The Margrave had invited a small gathering to his secret wedding, including three women who were friends of the Countess, her brother Flaminio Balbiano, and some local Torino notables; on the German side were a Prince of Hesse-Cassel and a Captain Beaupré, currently serving in Brandenburg’s army. The local priest Fr. Galli was summoned, and before him and in the presence of Abbot Alexander del Marro and the Chevalier Parella, they declared their determination to marry. But the priest refused to co-operate on the grounds that they were not his parishioners. The Abbot and Captain Beaupré fought; Staff intervened and the Margrave then fell upon the Master of Horse with drawn sword, who fled.

Riding on, the three colonels came upon the Margrave, heading for the Countess’ house in Turin in his carriage with his escort. They joined the cavalcade, and when they reached the destination the Prince’s advisors implored him not to carry on. Neither the Elector of Brandenburg, nor the Duke of Savoy recognized the marriage. To avoid diplomatic complications, Duke Victor Amadeus imprisoned Caterina in a convent. The Curia supported Charles Philip's claim that the marriage was legal, in the hope that he would convert to Catholicism. While the issue was still being debated, Charles Philip died of a fever or (it was said) of a broken heart. He was buried in the Hohenzollern family crypt in Berlin Cathedral.

Two years later, Rome ruled that the marriage was valid. The Elector still did not recognize it.

In 1707, Caterina married the Saxon general Count August Christoph von Wackerbarth.

== Footnotes ==
Charles Philip of Brandenburg-Schwedt House of Hohenzollern Born: 5 January 1673 Died: 23 July 1695
Preceded by Georg Friedrich, Fürst zu Waldeck, Graf zu Pyrmont	Herrenmeister (Grand Master) of the Order of Saint John; 1693–1695	Succeeded by Margrave Albert Frederick of Brandenburg-Schwedt
