= Charles, Electoral Prince of Brandenburg =

Electoral Prince of Brandenburg (1655–1674)

Charles
- Electoral Prince of Brandenburg
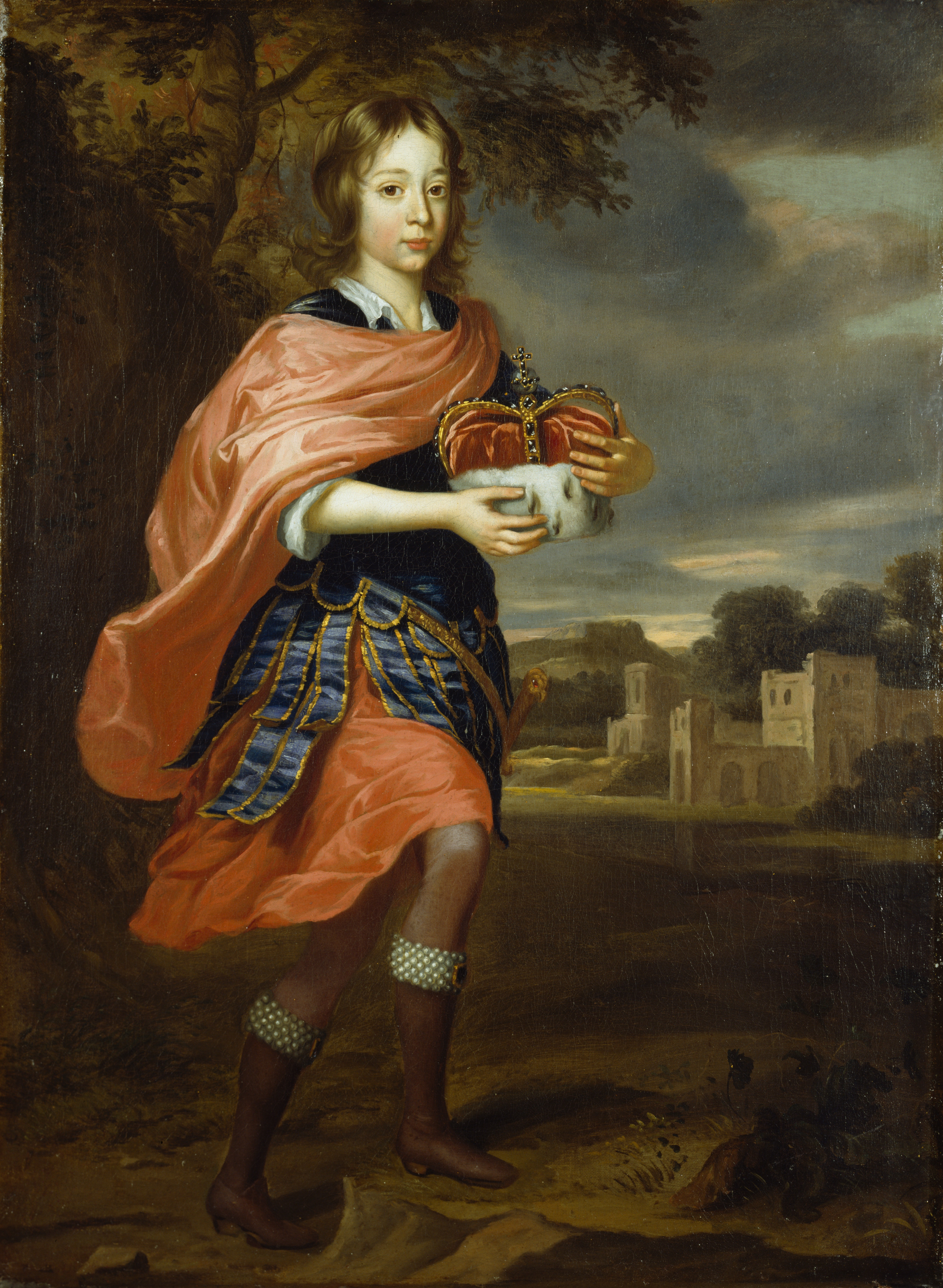
- Portrait c. 1666–67
- Born: 16 February 1655; Berlin
- Died: 7 December 1674 (aged 19); Strasbourg
- Burial: Berlin Cathedral
- House: Hohenzollern
- Father: Frederick William, Elector of Brandenburg
- Mother: Countess Louise Henriette of Nassau

Charles Emil, Electoral Prince of Brandenburg (German: Karl Emil; 16 February 1655 – 7 December 1674) was a German prince as heir apparent to the Electorate of Brandenburg.

== Life ==
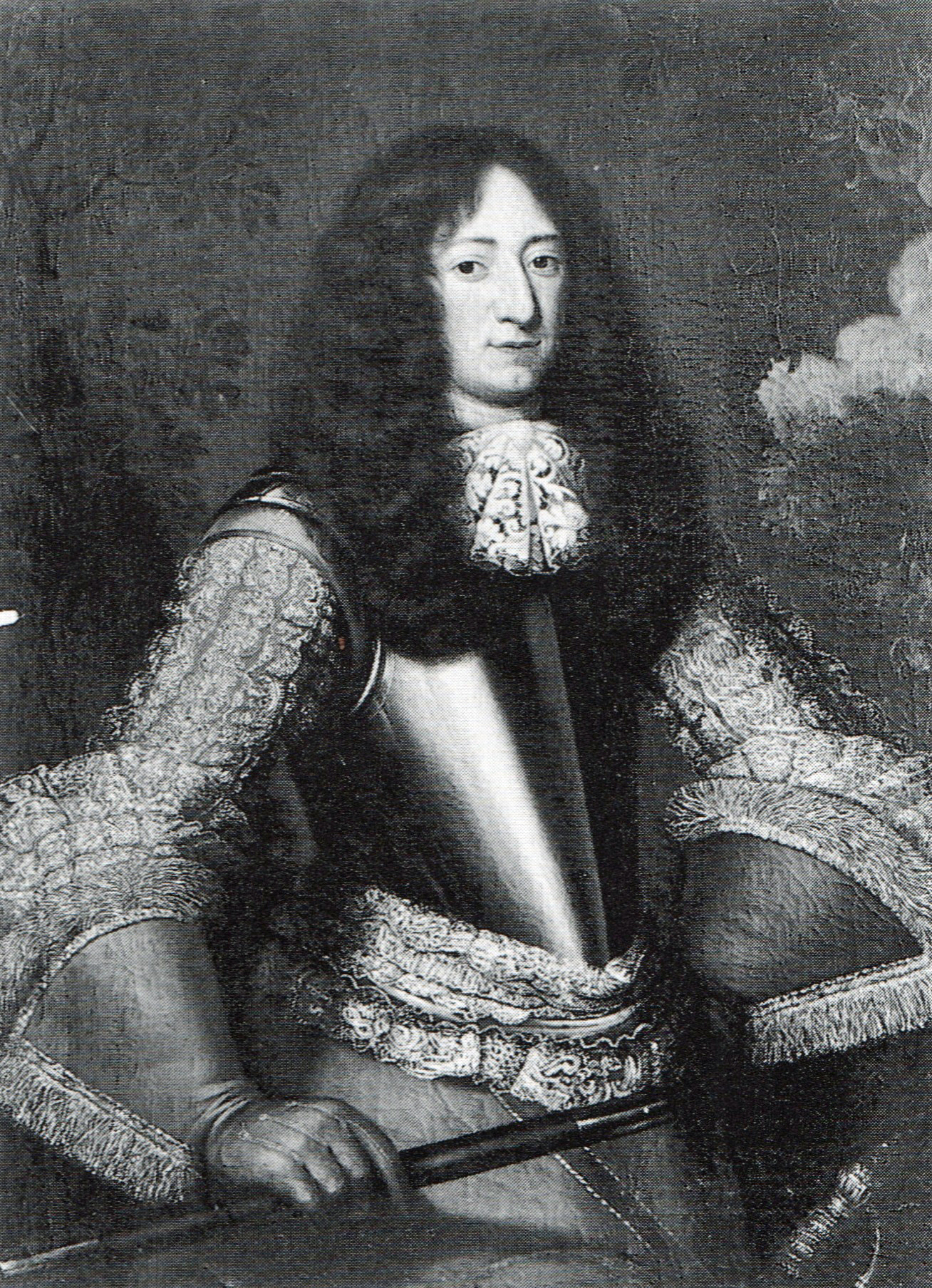
Portrait of Charles by Jacques Vaillant, 1673

He was the second son of Frederick William, Elector of Brandenburg, and his first son to survive infancy – his elder brother William Henry had died at less than two years old in 1649. He was born on his father's 35th birthday, after six years of unsuccessful pregnancies (miscarriages) for his mother, Countess Luise Henriette of Nassau. The city of Amsterdam had taken on the sponsorship, and burgomaster Joan Huydecoper van Maarsseveen, his son Joan and his second cousin Pieter de Graeff traveled to Berlin to talk to Elector Friedrich Wilhelm about an alliance against Sweden, which was then sealed to the advantage of both sides.

Charles looked like his father and was raised to be like him: spirited, quick-tempered and in favour of war and the hunt. According to his tutor, the most effective way of subduing him was to take away his sword for a few days.

In 1670 he was made colonel of the Regiment Radziwiłł zu Fuß and four years later he and his father headed the Brandenburg force on its incursion into Alsace during the Franco-Dutch War. The campaign soon became mired into incessant manoeuvring, with the imperial commanded Bournonville afraid or unwilling to give battle. A cold wet autumn arrived, leading to supply and sanitary problems and disease in the Brandenburg army. Charles became ill late in November and at the start of December was sent to Strasbourg to recover. After seven days of a rising fever, he died of dysentery.
