= Joachim Friedrich von Blumenthal =

German nobleman and diplomat (1607–1657)

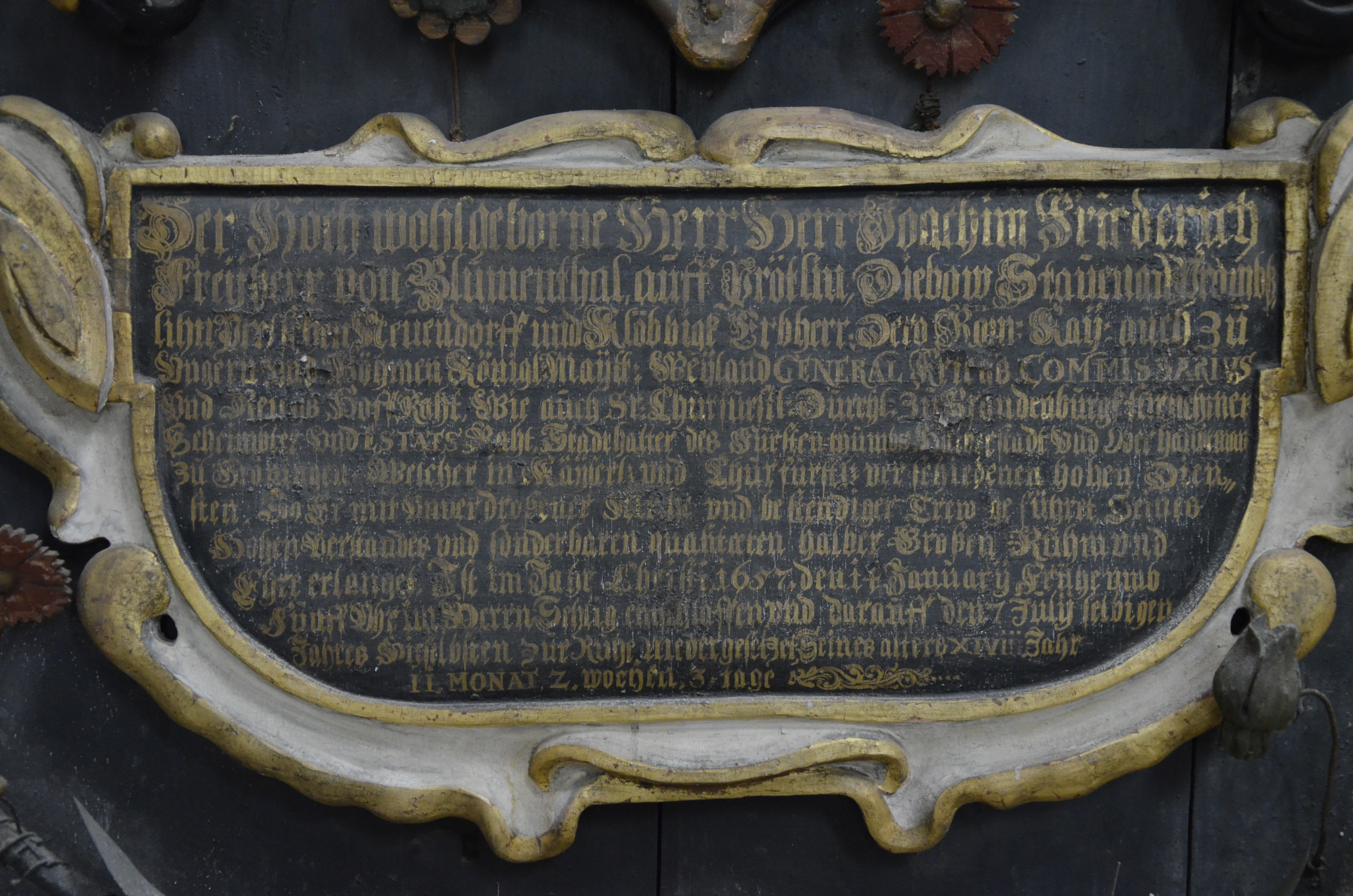
Epitaph Blumenthal Detail

Joachim Friedrich von Blumenthal (24 May 1607 in Berlin – 7 July 1657 in Halberstadt) was a German nobleman. He was a diplomat and the founder of the Brandenburg-Prussian Army.

The son of Christoph von Blumenthal and his wife Dorothea von Hacke, and the first cousin of General von Königsmarck, he was educated privately by the family tutor Johannes Crüger from the age of 10, and then attended the Viadrina from 1622, at the age of 15. In 1623 his mother died, and in 1624 his brother was murdered and father died, leaving him in the wardship of his eldest brother Christoph; however he too died within two years and Joachim Friedrich became head of his family, still only 19 years old. He became a protégé of Schwarzenberg and thus closely tied to the pro-Imperial faction in Brandenburg during the period of the Thirty Years' War. In 1635 Schwarzenberg entrusted him with raising Brandenburg's first-ever standing army as the head of General War Commissariat.

On Schwarzenberg's dismissal, von Blumenthal temporarily fell from grace in Brandenburg and took service with the Habsburgs, under whom he was an Imperial War Commissar, but he was then also simultaneously employed as both Brandenburg and the Holy Roman Empire's representative at the Peace of Westphalia of 1648, where he negotiated Brandenburg's acquisition of Halberstadt and other territories. He was several times Brandenburg's representative at Imperial Diets. He became the Great Elector's President of the Privy Council (Prime Minister) and it was in this capacity that he raised the finances and organized the system under which a permanent standing army could be created for the first time. He was the first secular governor of the Principality of Halberstadt.

Von Blumenthal was married first, in 1635, to Katharina von Klitzing, and then in 1639 to Elisabeth von Holtzendorff. His eldest son Christoph Caspar, by his first marriage, became a distinguished diplomat who was Brandenburg's Ambassador to France and negotiated the Peace of Oliva. His other son Montanus, by the second marriage, was a captain in von Königsmarck's regiment and died at Mainz in November 1672.

A minister of the Great Elector, von Blumenthal had profited handsomely from the war, and remodeled Schloss Stavenow in the Baroque style. He was promoted to Freiherr for his services.
