= Margrave Christian Ludwig of Brandenburg-Schwedt =

17/18th-century Prussian nobleman and Army officer

Christian Ludwig of Brandenburg-Schwedt
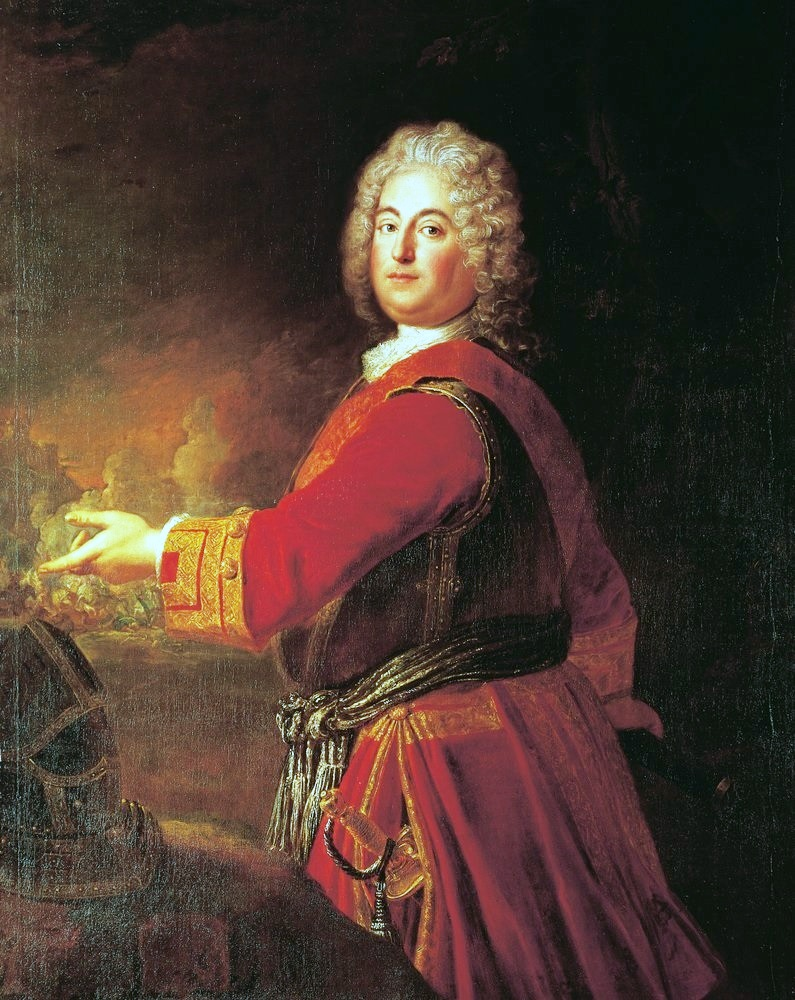
- Christian Ludwig wearing the red tunic of his Infantry Regiment, painting by Antoine Pesne (about 1710)
- Born: 24 May 1677; Berlin, Brandenburg
- Died: 3 September 1734 (aged 57); Malchow, Brandenburg
- Burial: Berlin Cathedral
- House: Hohenzollern
- Father: Frederick William, Elector of Brandenburg
- Mother: Sophia Dorothea of Schleswig-Holstein-Sonderburg-Glücksburg
- Occupation: Military officer

Margrave Christian Ludwig of Brandenburg-Schwedt (14 May 1677 – 3 September 1734), a member of the House of Hohenzollern, was a Margrave of Brandenburg-Schwedt and a military officer of the Prussian Army. The margravial title was given to princes of the Prussian Royal House and did not express a territorial status. He is best known as the recipient of Johann Sebastian Bach's Brandenburg concertos.

== Biography ==
Born in Berlin, Christian Ludwig was the youngest son of the "Great Elector" Frederick William (1620–1688), ruler of Brandenburg-Prussia, and his second wife Princess Sophia Dorothea of Schleswig-Holstein-Sonderburg-Glücksburg (1636–1689). Like his elder brothers, Christian Ludwig inherited large estates around Schwedt, Vierraden and Wildenbruch which his mother had acquired to provide for her sons, while according to the Hohenzollern primogeniture principle the rule over Brandenburg-Prussia passed to Frederick William's first-born son, Crown Prince Frederick III, who became King in Prussia in 1701.

Even in Brandenburg-Schwedt, however, he had to accept the prerogative of his eldest brother Margrave Philip William. Moreover, sober times began in 1713 with the accession of King Frederick William I, known as the "Soldier King", who enlisted large financial resources to build up the Prussian Army. Nevertheless, Christian Ludwig, interested in the musical works of Georg Frideric Handel, was able to maintain a court orchestra at the Berlin City Palace. He also was vested with the estates of Malchow and Heinersdorf, earning him a regular income and an officer commission.

From 1695 Margrave Christian Ludwig served as a general lieutenant at the Stettin garrison and commander of the Old Prussian Infantry Regiment No.7. He also acted as administrator of the secularised Prussian Principality of Halberstadt and was awarded the Order of the Black Eagle for his merits. When Johann Sebastian Bach was sent to Berlin by Prince Leopold of Anhalt-Köthen in 1719, the composer met with the music-loving margrave. Bach appreciated Christian Ludwig's interest in his compositions and two years later dedicated his Six Concerts Avec plusieurs Instruments (BWV 1046–1051) to him. The concerti were never played in Christian Ludwig's lifetime, as they were considered too difficult for the court musicians to play. They were sold upon his death and placed in an attic, until discovered by a servant in 1849, who was cleaning it out.

Margrave Christian Ludwig died without heirs in Malchow. He is buried in the Hohenzollern crypt of Berlin Cathedral.

== Ancestry ==
Ancestors of Margrave Christian Ludwig of Brandenburg-Schwedt

8. John Sigismund, Elector of Brandenburg
4. George William, Elector of Brandenburg
9. Duchess Anna of Prussia
2. Frederick William I, Elector of Brandenburg
10. Frederick IV, Elector Palatine
5. Elizabeth Charlotte of the Palatinate
11. Countess Louise Juliana of Nassau
1. Margrave Christian Ludwig of Brandenburg-Schwedt
12. John II, Duke of Schleswig-Holstein-Sonderburg
6. Philip, Duke of Schleswig-Holstein-Sonderburg-Glücksburg
13. Elisabeth of Brunswick-Grubenhagen
3. Sophia Dorothea of Schleswig-Holstein-Sonderburg-Glücksburg
14. Francis II, Duke of Saxe-Lauenburg
7. Sophia Hedwig of Saxe-Lauenburg
15. Maria of Brunswick-Lüneburg

== Sources ==
- Boyd, Malcolm (1993). Bach: The Brandenburg Concertos. Cambridge: Cambridge University Press. ISBN 0521382769. OL 1734852M.
