= Karl Ludwig von Pöllnitz =

German soldier, adventurer and writer (1692–1775)

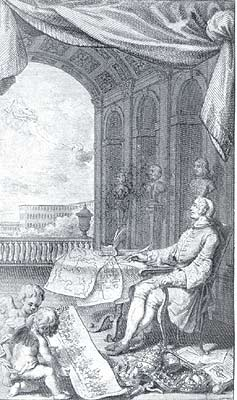
Karl Ludwig von Pöllnitz.

Karl Ludwig Freiherr von Pöllnitz (25 February 1692 – 23 June 1775) was a German adventurer and writer from Issum.

== Life ==
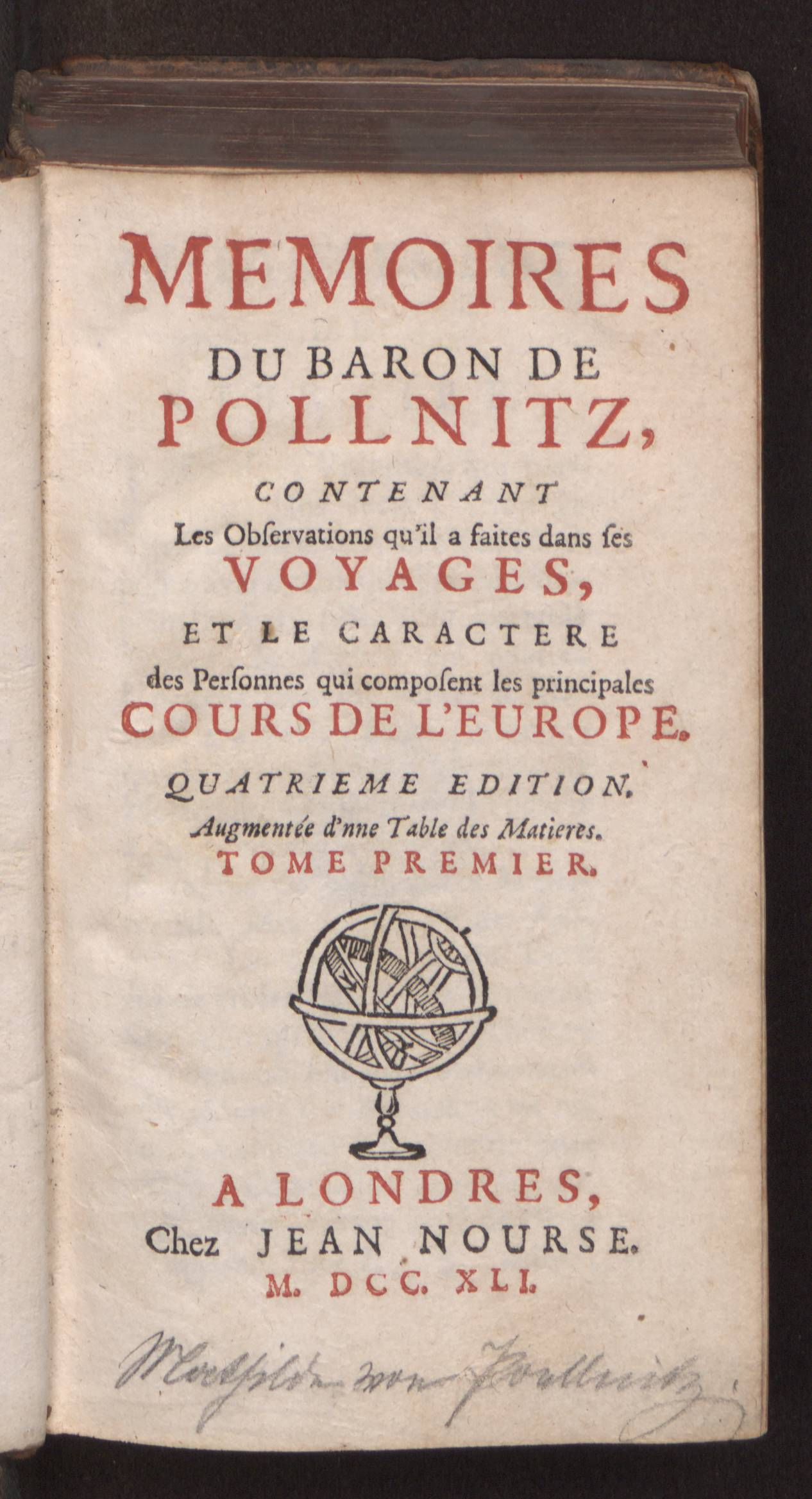
Memoires du baron de Pollnitz, 1741

His father, Wilhelm Ludwig Freiherr von Pöllnitz (d. 1693), was in the military service of the elector of Brandenburg, and much of his son's youth was passed at the electoral court in Berlin. He was a man of restless and adventurous disposition, unscrupulous even for the age in which he lived, visited many of the European courts, and served as a soldier in Austria, Italy and Spain.

Returning to Berlin in 1735, he obtained a position in the household of King Frederick William I of Prussia and afterwards in that of Frederick the Great, with whom he appears to have been a great favorite; and he died in Berlin on June 23, 1775.

Pöllnitz's Mémoires (Liège, 1734), which were translated into German (Frankfurt, 1735), give interesting glimpses of his life and the people whom he met, but they are very untrustworthy. He also wrote Nouveaux mémoires (Amsterdam, 1737); Etat abrégé de la cour de Saxe sous le règne d'Auguste III. (Frankfurt, 1734; Ger. trans., Breslau, 1736); and Mémoires pour servir a l'histoire des quatres derniers souverains de la maison de Branderibourg, published by F. L. Brunn (Berlin, 1791; Ger. trans., Berlin, 1791).

Perhaps his most popular works are La Saxe galante (Amsterdam, 1734, English translation 1929), an account of the private life of Augustus the Strong, elector of Saxony and king of Poland; and Histoire secrete de la duchesse d'Hanovre, épouse de Georges I (London, 1732). There is an English translation of the Mémoires (London, 1737-1738). See P. von Pöllnitz, Stammtafeln der Familie von Pöllnitz (Berlin, 1894); and J. G. Droysen, Geschichte der preussischen Politik, pt. iv. (Leipzig, 1870).
