= Michel Bouvier =

Michel Bouvier may refer to:

- Michel Bouvier (carpenter), Carpenter and member of the Bouvier family
- Michel Bouvier (scientist), Canadian scientist
