= Pont-Saint-Esprit =

- Commune
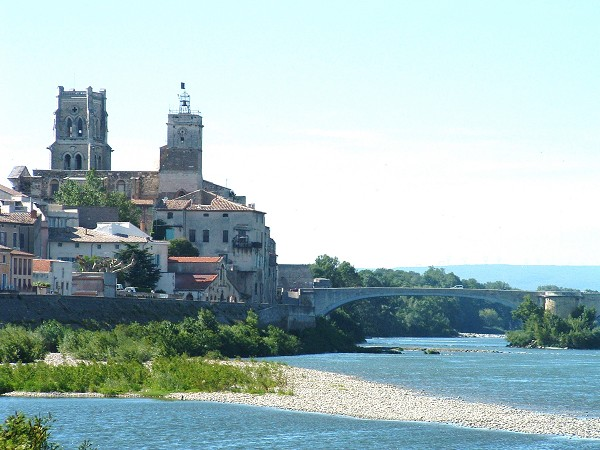
- Saint Saturnin church and the medieval bridge over the Rhône River

- Coat of arms
- Location of Pont-Saint-Esprit
- Location within France Location within Occitanie
- Coordinates: 44°15′27″N 4°38′57″E
- Country: France
- Region: Occitania
- Department: Gard
- Arrondissement: Nîmes
- Canton: Pont-Saint-Esprit
- Intercommunality: CA Gard Rhodanien

Government
  - Mayor (2024–2026): Valère Segal
- Area^{1}: 18.49 km^{2} (7.14 sq mi)
- Elevation: 59 m (194 ft)
- Highest elevation: 187 m (614 ft)
- Lowest elevation: 36 m (118 ft)
- Population (2023): 10,958
  - Density: 592.6/km^{2} (1,535/sq mi)
- Time zone: UTC+01:00 (CET)
  - Summer (DST): UTC+02:00 (CEST)
- INSEE/Postal code: 30202 /30130
- ^{1} French Land Register data, which excludes lakes, ponds, glaciers > 1 km^{2} (0.386 sq mi or 247 acres) and river estuaries.

Pont-Saint-Esprit (French pronunciation: [pɔ̃ sɛ̃.t‿ɛspʁi], literally "Holy Spirit Bridge"; Occitan: Lo Pònt Sant Esperit) is a commune in the Gard département in southern France. It is situated on the river Rhône and is the site of a historical crossing, hence its name. The Ardèche flows into the Rhône, just to the north of the bridge. The residents are called Spiripontains.

== History ==
The bridge was observed by the Irish pilgrim Symon Semeonis in 1323 on his way to the Holy Land: "Pont-Saint-Esprit where there is a famous stone bridge over the Rhône, half a mile in length, the height of which and the breadth of its arches are greatly admired by all those who cross over it." Italian canon Antonio de Beatis described the bridge in his 1517-1518 travel journal: "This has twenty tall, wide arches, is finely built in a pleasing stone and is still better paved."

In the seventeenth century the Jewish immigrants from Spain were cast out of central Bayonne and settled in Saint Esprit. This quarter became known in popular parlance as Saint Esprit les Israélites because Jews constituted the majority of its population -which was extremely rare in France. It was a Jew of Spanish origin, Gaspar Dacosta, who introduced the art of chocolate-making to Saint Esprit, and indeed in France.

== Geography ==
=== Climate ===
Pont-Saint-Esprit has a humid subtropical climate (Köppen climate classification: Cfa). The average annual temperature in Pont-Saint-Esprit is 14.2 °C (57.6 °F). The average annual rainfall is 829.8 mm (32.67 in) with November as the wettest month. The temperatures are highest on average in July, at around 23.9 °C (75.0 °F), and lowest in January, at around 5.5 °C (41.9 °F). The highest temperature ever recorded in Pont-Saint-Esprit was 42.2 °C (108.0 °F) on 6 August 2003; the coldest temperature ever recorded was −12.7 °C (9.1 °F) on 7 January 1985.

Climate data for Pont-Saint-Esprit (1991−2020 normals, extremes 1972−present)
Month	Jan	Feb	Mar	Apr	May	Jun	Jul	Aug	Sep	Oct	Nov	Dec	Year
Record high °C (°F)	19.9 (67.8)	23.2 (73.8)	27.0 (80.6)	30.0 (86.0)	34.4 (93.9)	39.3 (102.7)	40.1 (104.2)	42.2 (108.0)	36.0 (96.8)	29.5 (85.1)	23.5 (74.3)	20.0 (68.0)	42.2 (108.0)
Mean daily maximum °C (°F)	9.1 (48.4)	11.0 (51.8)	15.7 (60.3)	18.9 (66.0)	23.4 (74.1)	27.4 (81.3)	30.6 (87.1)	30.4 (86.7)	24.8 (76.6)	19.3 (66.7)	13.1 (55.6)	9.6 (49.3)	19.4 (66.9)
Daily mean °C (°F)	5.5 (41.9)	6.5 (43.7)	10.3 (50.5)	13.1 (55.6)	17.3 (63.1)	21.1 (70.0)	23.9 (75.0)	23.7 (74.7)	19.1 (66.4)	14.8 (58.6)	9.4 (48.9)	6.1 (43.0)	14.2 (57.6)
Mean daily minimum °C (°F)	1.8 (35.2)	2.1 (35.8)	5.0 (41.0)	7.4 (45.3)	11.2 (52.2)	14.7 (58.5)	17.1 (62.8)	17.1 (62.8)	13.4 (56.1)	10.2 (50.4)	5.6 (42.1)	2.6 (36.7)	9.0 (48.2)
Record low °C (°F)	−12.7 (9.1)	−10.2 (13.6)	−7.7 (18.1)	−1.4 (29.5)	1.6 (34.9)	5.0 (41.0)	8.0 (46.4)	7.1 (44.8)	4.0 (39.2)	−0.2 (31.6)	−5.0 (23.0)	−7.2 (19.0)	−12.7 (9.1)
Average precipitation mm (inches)	67.8 (2.67)	43.9 (1.73)	47.0 (1.85)	67.3 (2.65)	64.3 (2.53)	48.6 (1.91)	39.9 (1.57)	47.2 (1.86)	109.1 (4.30)	117.6 (4.63)	118.2 (4.65)	58.9 (2.32)	829.8 (32.67)
Average precipitation days (≥ 1.0 mm)	6.1	5.1	5.1	6.8	6.7	5.1	3.7	4.2	5.7	7.3	8.1	6.4	70.3
Source: Météo-France

== Bouvier family origins ==
Pont-Saint-Esprit is famous as the town of origin of Michel Bouvier, a cabinetmaker, who was the ancestor of John Vernou Bouvier III, father of Jacqueline Kennedy.

== 1951 mass poisoning incident ==
On 15 August 1951, an outbreak of poisoning, marked by acute psychotic episodes and various physical symptoms, occurred in Pont-Saint-Esprit. More than 250 people were involved, including 50 persons interned in asylums and four deaths. Most academic sources accept naturally occurring ergot poisoning in rye flour as the cause of the epidemic, while a few theorize other causes such as poisoning by mercury, mycotoxins, or nitrogen trichloride.

== Population ==
Historical population

Year	Pop.	±% p.a.
1793	5,766	—
1800	4,055	−4.90%
1806	4,331	+1.10%
1821	4,545	+0.32%
1831	4,853	+0.66%
1836	4,937	+0.34%
1841	5,239	+1.19%
1846	5,375	+0.51%
1851	5,538	+0.60%
1856	5,887	+1.23%
1861	5,123	−2.74%
1866	4,694	−1.73%
1872	4,350	−1.26%
1876	4,826	+2.63%
1881	4,726	−0.42%
1886	4,962	+0.98%
1891	5,262	+1.18%
1896	4,289	−4.01%
1901	4,798	+2.27%

Year	Pop.	±% p.a.
1906	4,906	+0.45%
1911	4,685	−0.92%
1921	5,801	+2.16%
1926	4,409	−5.34%
1931	4,652	+1.08%
1936	4,411	−1.06%
1946	4,149	−0.61%
1954	4,925	+2.17%
1962	5,778	+2.02%
1968	6,951	+3.13%
1975	6,709	−0.50%
1982	8,067	+2.67%
1990	9,277	+1.76%
1999	9,265	−0.01%
2007	9,846	+0.76%
2012	10,651	+1.58%
2017	10,336	−0.60%
2023	10,958	+0.98%

Source: EHESS and INSEE (1968-2023)

== International relations ==
Pont-Saint-Esprit is twinned with:

- Egelsbach, Germany
- Haverhill, United Kingdom
- Penacova, Portugal

== Notable people ==
- Michel Bouvier (1792–1874), carpenter and French American immigrant to Philadelphia
- Joseph Di Mambro (1924–1994), French cult leader

== See also ==
- Communes of the Gard department
