= Michel Bouvier (carpenter) =

French-American businessman (1792–1874)

- Bouvier in the 1860s
- Born: Michel Charles Bouvier; March 19, 1792; Pont-Saint-Esprit, Kingdom of France
- Died: June 9, 1874 (aged 82); Philadelphia, Pennsylvania, U.S.
- Occupations: Businessman; carpenter; land speculator
- Known for: Establishing the Bouvier family
- Spouses: Sarah Ann Pearson (died 1826) Louise Clifford Vernou (died 1872)
- Children: 12
- Family: Bouvier family
- Military career
- Allegiance: French Empire
- Conflicts: Napoleonic Wars

Michel Charles Bouvier (March 19, 1792 – June 9, 1874) was a French-American immigrant to Philadelphia. He established the Bouvier family in the United States.

== Early life and education ==
Michel Bouvier (later anglicized to Michael) was born in Pont-Saint-Esprit, in the South of France in 1792, the son of Eustache and Theresa Bouvier. He served in the Napoleonic Wars. He apprenticed to a cabinetmaker, before being drafted into Napoleon's army. After French defeat at Waterloo, he fled France, moving to Philadelphia in 1815.

== Career ==
Bouvier established a successful furniture business in Philadelphia. Among his clients were Napoleon's brother, Joseph Bonaparte, former King of Spain and Naples, and Stephen Girard, a prominent banker. Because of the success of his furniture business, he expanded into other industries. He started a business selling firewood, which led him to acquire 3,237.4 square kilometres (1,250.0 mi^{2}; 800,000 acres) of forest. This venture turned out to be a success as the forest contained large reserves of coal which Bouvier had not known about. He further expanded his interests with more real estate speculation.

Furniture made by Bouvier are displayed at the Athenaeum of Philadelphia and the Brooklyn Museum.

== Personal life ==
Bouvier was married first to Sarah Ann Pearson, who died in 1826 at the age of 21. The couple had three children:

- Joseph Alexander Bouvier (1822–1856)
- Eustache Bouvier (1824–1886)
- Theresa Elizabeth Bouvier (1826–1916)

He later married Louise Clifford Vernou, (1811–1872) with whom he had nine more children:

- Elizabeth Bouvier (1829–1884)
- Louise Bouvier (1831–1902)
- Emma Mary Bouvier (1833–1883)
- Zenaide Bouvier (1835–1914)
- Alexine Bouvier (1837–1914)
- Mary Howell Bouvier (1841–1931)
- John Vernou Bouvier Sr. (1843–1926)
- Josephine Bouvier (1845–1847)
- Michel Charles Bouvier Jr. (1847–1935)

His sons John V. Bouvier Sr and Michel Charles Bouvier Jr. distinguished themselves on Wall Street, moving their families to New York City. The prominent modern-day Bouvier family, including former First Lady of the United States Jacqueline Bouvier Kennedy descends from John Sr.

Bouvier built the Bouvier mansion, along with several other Philadelphia homes.
