= Jacqueline Kennedy Onassis =

First Lady of the United States from 1961 to 1963

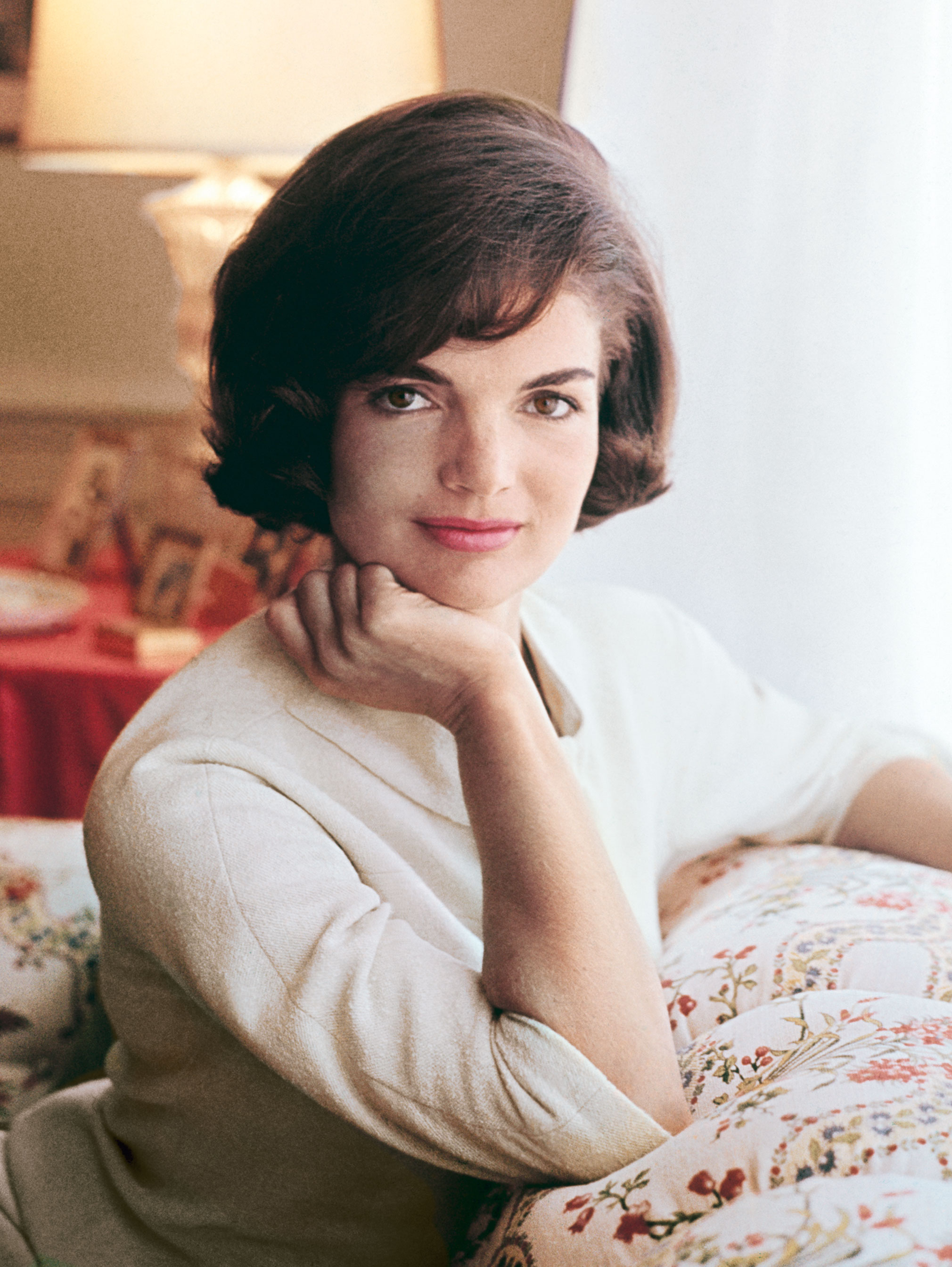
- Kennedy in 1961

First Lady of the United States
- In role January 20, 1961 – November 22, 1963
- President: John F. Kennedy
- Preceded by: Mamie Eisenhower
- Succeeded by: Lady Bird Johnson

Personal details
- Born: Jacqueline Lee Bouvier; July 28, 1929 Southampton, New York, U.S.
- Died: May 19, 1994 (aged 64) New York City, U.S.
- Resting place: Arlington National Cemetery
- Party: Democratic
- Spouses: John F. Kennedy (m. 1953; died 1963) Aristotle Onassis (m. 1968; died 1975)
- Domestic partner: Maurice Tempelsman (1980–1994)
- Children: 4, including Caroline, John Jr., and Patrick
- Parents: John Vernou Bouvier III; Janet Lee Bouvier
- Relatives: Bouvier family
- Education: Vassar College; George Washington University (BA)
- Occupation: Socialite; book editor; journalist

Jacqueline Lee Kennedy Onassis (née Bouvier; July 28, 1929 – May 19, 1994) was the first lady of the United States from 1961 to 1963, as the wife of John F. Kennedy, the 35th president of the United States. She redefined the previously mostly ceremonial role into a platform for arts and culture by hosting multiple high-profile events at the White House and leading its restoration into being a historical site. Through her fashion and cultural literacy, she improved the global standing of the United States during the politically volatile Cold War. Her personal style became known as the "Jackie Look", which inspired worldwide fashion trends during the 1960s.

Born into the upper-class Bouvier family in Southampton, New York, Bouvier studied history and art at Vassar College before graduating with a Bachelor of Arts in French literature from George Washington University in 1951. She then began working for the Washington Times-Herald as an inquiring photographer. The following year, she met then-congressman John Fitzgerald Kennedy of Massachusetts at a dinner party in Washington. He was elected to the Senate that same year, and the couple married on September 12, 1953, in Newport, Rhode Island. They had four children, two of whom died in infancy. Following her husband's election to the presidency in 1960, Kennedy was known for her highly publicized restoration of the White House and emphasis on arts and culture as well as for her style. She also traveled to many countries where her fluency in foreign languages and history made her very popular. At age 33, she was named Time magazine's Woman of the Year in 1962.

After her husband's assassination and funeral in 1963, Kennedy and her children largely withdrew from public view. In 1968, she married Greek shipping magnate Aristotle Onassis, which caused controversy. Following Onassis's death in 1975, she had a career as a book editor in New York City, first at Viking Press and then at Doubleday, and worked to restore her public image. Even after her death, she ranks as one of the most popular and recognizable first ladies in American history, and in 1999, she was placed on the list of Gallup's Most-Admired Men and Women of the 20th century. She died in 1994 and is buried at Arlington National Cemetery alongside President Kennedy and two of their children, one stillborn and one who died shortly after birth. Surveys of historians conducted periodically by the Siena Research Institute since 1982 have also consistently found Kennedy Onassis to rank among the most highly regarded first ladies.

== Early life (1929–1951) ==
=== Family and childhood ===
Jacqueline Lee Bouvier was born on July 28, 1929, at Southampton Hospital in Southampton, New York, to Wall Street stockbroker John Vernou "Black Jack" Bouvier III and socialite Janet Norton Lee. Her mother was of Irish descent, and her father had French, Scottish, and English ancestry. (Note: Her French family had its origins in the Rhone River valley village of Pont-Saint-Esprit and left France for the U.S. in the first years of the 19th century. Although the French and English ancestors of the Bouviers were mostly middle class, her paternal grandfather John Vernou Bouvier Jr., fabricated a more noble ancestry for the family in his vanity family history book, Our Forebears, later disproved by the research by her cousin John Hagy Davis.) Named after her father, she was baptized at the Church of St. Ignatius Loyola in Manhattan and raised in the Roman Catholic faith. Caroline Lee, her younger sister, was born four years later on March 3, 1933.

Jacqueline Bouvier spent her early childhood years in Manhattan and at Lasata, the Bouviers' country estate in East Hampton on Long Island. She looked up to her father, who likewise favored her over her sister, calling his elder child "the most beautiful daughter a man ever had". Biographer Tina Santi Flaherty reports Jacqueline's early confidence in herself, seeing a link to her father's praise and positive attitude to her, and her sister Lee Radziwill stated that Jacqueline would not have gained her "independence and individuality" had it not been for the relationship she had with their father and paternal grandfather, John Vernou Bouvier Jr. From an early age, Jacqueline was an enthusiastic equestrian and successfully competed in the sport, and horse-riding remained a lifelong passion. She took ballet lessons, was an avid reader, and excelled at learning foreign languages, including French, Spanish, and Italian. French was particularly emphasized in her upbringing.

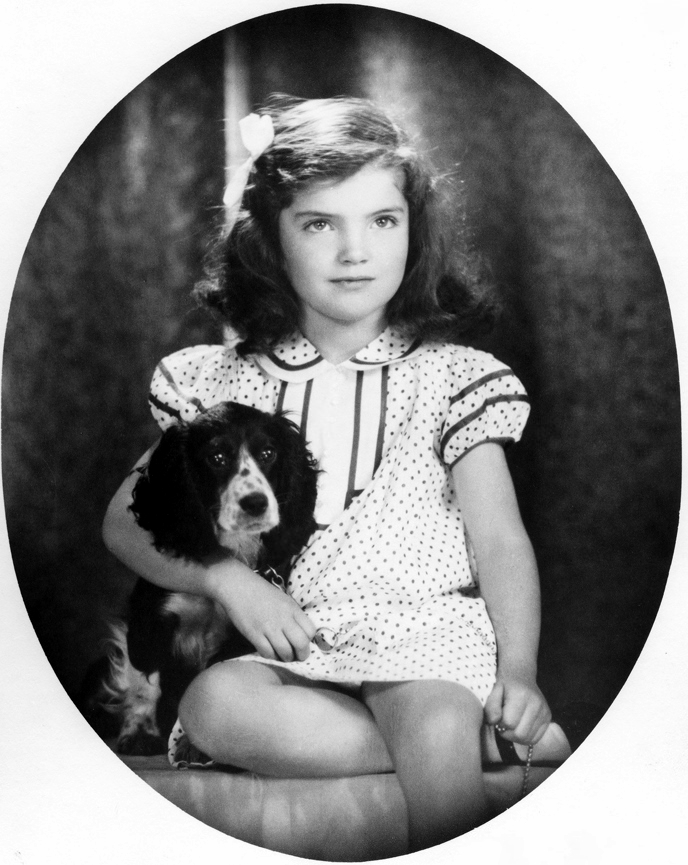
Six-year-old Jacqueline Bouvier with her dog in 1935

In 1935, Jacqueline Bouvier was enrolled in Manhattan's Chapin School, where she attended grades 1–7. She was a bright student but often misbehaved; one of her teachers described her as "a darling child, the prettiest little girl, very clever, very artistic, and full of the devil". Her mother attributed this behavior to her finishing her assignments ahead of classmates and then acting out in boredom. Her behavior improved after the headmistress warned her that none of her positive qualities would matter if she did not behave.

The marriage of the Bouviers was strained by the father's alcoholism and extramarital affairs; the family had also struggled with financial difficulties following the Wall Street Crash of 1929. They separated in 1936 and divorced four years later, with the press publishing intimate details of the split. According to her cousin John H. Davis, Jacqueline was deeply affected by the divorce and subsequently had a "tendency to withdraw frequently into a private world of her own." When their mother married stockbroker and lawyer Hugh D. Auchincloss Jr., the Bouvier sisters did not attend the ceremony because it was arranged quickly and travel was restricted due to World War II. They gained three stepsiblings from Auchincloss's previous marriages, Hugh "Yusha" Auchincloss III, Thomas Gore Auchincloss, and Nina Gore Auchincloss. Jacqueline formed the closest bond with Yusha, who became one of her most trusted confidants. The marriage later produced two more children, Janet Jennings Auchincloss in 1945 and James Lee Auchincloss in 1947.

After the remarriage, Auchincloss's Merrywood estate in McLean, Virginia, became the Bouvier sisters' primary residence, although they also spent time at his other estate, Hammersmith Farm in Newport, Rhode Island, and in their father's homes in New York City and Long Island. Although she retained a relationship with her father, Jacqueline Bouvier also regarded her stepfather as a close paternal figure. He gave her a stable environment and the pampered childhood she otherwise would have never experienced. While adjusting to her mother's remarriage, she sometimes felt like an outsider in the WASP social circle of the Auchinclosses, attributing the feeling to her being Catholic as well as being a child of divorce, which was not common in that social group at that time.

After seven years at Chapin, Jacqueline Bouvier attended the Holton-Arms School in Northwest Washington, D.C., from 1942 to 1944 and Miss Porter's School in Farmington, Connecticut, from 1944 to 1947. She chose Miss Porter's because it was a boarding school that allowed her to distance herself from the Auchinclosses and because the school placed an emphasis on college preparatory classes. In her senior class yearbook, Bouvier was acknowledged for "her wit, her accomplishment as a horsewoman, and her unwillingness to become a housewife". She later hired her childhood friend Nancy Tuckerman to be her social secretary at the White House. She graduated among the top students of her class and received the Maria McKinney Memorial Award for Excellence in Literature.

=== College and early career ===
In the fall of 1947, Jacqueline Bouvier entered Vassar College in Poughkeepsie, New York, at that time a women's institution. She had wanted to attend Sarah Lawrence College, closer to New York City, but her parents insisted that she choose the more isolated Vassar. She was an accomplished student who participated in the school's art and drama clubs and wrote for its newspaper. Due to her dislike of Vassar's location in Poughkeepsie, she did not take an active part in its social life and instead traveled back to Manhattan for the weekends. She had made her debut to high society in the summer before entering college and became a frequent presence in New York social functions. Hearst columnist Igor Cassini dubbed her the "debutante of the year". She spent her junior year (1949–1950) in France—at the University of Grenoble in Grenoble, and at the Sorbonne in Paris—in a study-abroad program through Smith College. Upon returning home, she transferred to George Washington University in Washington, D.C., graduating with a Bachelor of Arts degree in French literature in 1951. During the early years of her marriage to John F. Kennedy, she took continuing education classes in American history at Georgetown University in Washington, D.C.

While attending George Washington, Jacqueline Bouvier won a twelve-month junior editorship at Vogue magazine; she had been selected over several hundred other women nationwide. The position entailed working for six months in the magazine's New York City office and spending the remaining six months in Paris. Before beginning the job, she celebrated her college graduation and her sister Lee's high school graduation by traveling with her to Europe for the summer. The trip was the subject of her only autobiography, One Special Summer, co-authored with Lee; it is also the only one of her published works to feature Jacqueline Bouvier's drawings. On her first day at Vogue, the managing editor advised her to quit and go back to Washington. According to biographer Barbara Leaming, the editor was concerned about Bouvier's marriage prospects; she was 22 years of age and was considered too old to be single in her social circles. She followed the advice, left the job and returned to Washington after only one day of work.

Bouvier moved back to Merrywood and was referred by a family friend to the Washington Times-Herald, where editor Frank Waldrop hired her as a part-time receptionist. A week later she requested more challenging work, and Waldrop sent her to city editor Sidney Epstein, who hired her as an "Inquiring Camera Girl" despite her inexperience, paying her $25 a week. He recalled, "I remember her as this very attractive, cute-as-hell girl, and all the guys in the newsroom giving her a good look." The position required her to pose witty questions to individuals chosen at random on the street and take their pictures for publication in the newspaper alongside selected quotations from their responses. In addition to the random "man on the street" vignettes, she sometimes sought interviews with people of interest, such as six-year-old Tricia Nixon. Bouvier interviewed Tricia a few days after her father Richard Nixon was elected to the vice presidency in the 1952 election. During this time, Bouvier was briefly engaged to a young stockbroker named John Husted. After only a month of dating, the couple published the announcement in The New York Times in January 1952. After three months, she called off the engagement because she had found him "immature and boring" once she got to know him better.

== Marriage to John F. Kennedy ==
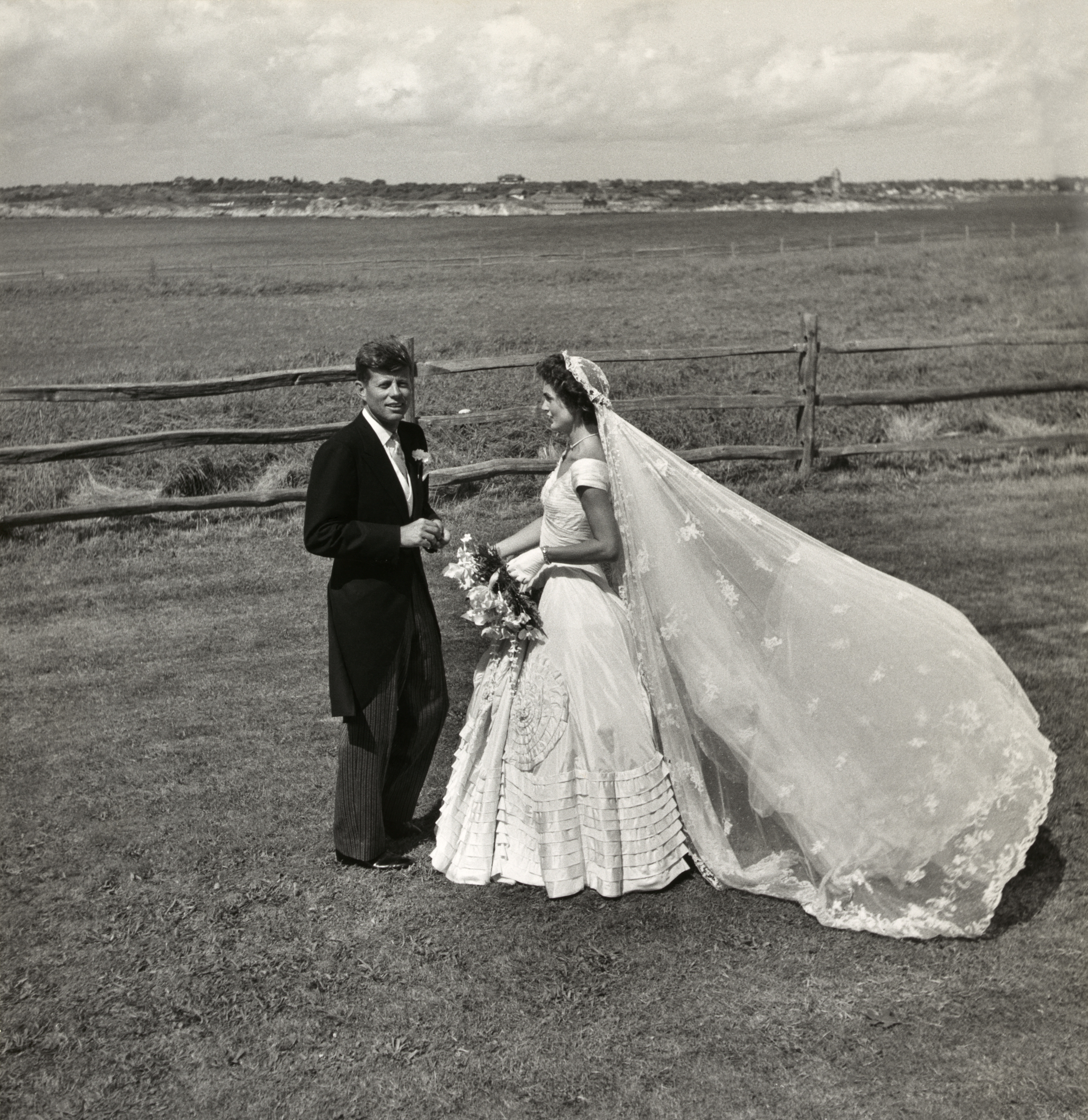
Senator John F. Kennedy and Jacqueline Kennedy on their wedding day, September 12, 1953

Jacqueline and U.S. representative John F. Kennedy met at a dinner party hosted by journalist Charles L. Bartlett in May 1952. She was attracted to Kennedy's physical appearance, wit and wealth. The pair also shared the similarities of Catholicism, writing, enjoying reading and having previously lived abroad. Kennedy was busy running for the U.S. Senate seat in Massachusetts; the relationship grew more serious and he proposed to her after the November election. Bouvier took some time to accept, because she had been assigned to cover the coronation of Elizabeth II in London for The Washington Times-Herald.

After a month in Europe, she returned to the United States and accepted Kennedy's marriage proposal. She then resigned from her position at the newspaper. Their engagement was officially announced on June 25, 1953. She was 24 and he was 36. Bouvier and Kennedy married on September 12, 1953, at St. Mary's Church in Newport, Rhode Island, in a Mass celebrated by Boston's Archbishop Richard Cushing. The wedding was considered the social event of the season with an estimated 700 guests at the ceremony and 1,200 at the reception that followed at Hammersmith Farm. The wedding dress was designed by Ann Lowe of New York City, and is now housed in the Kennedy Presidential Library in Boston. The dresses of her attendants were also created by Lowe, who was not credited by Jacqueline Kennedy.

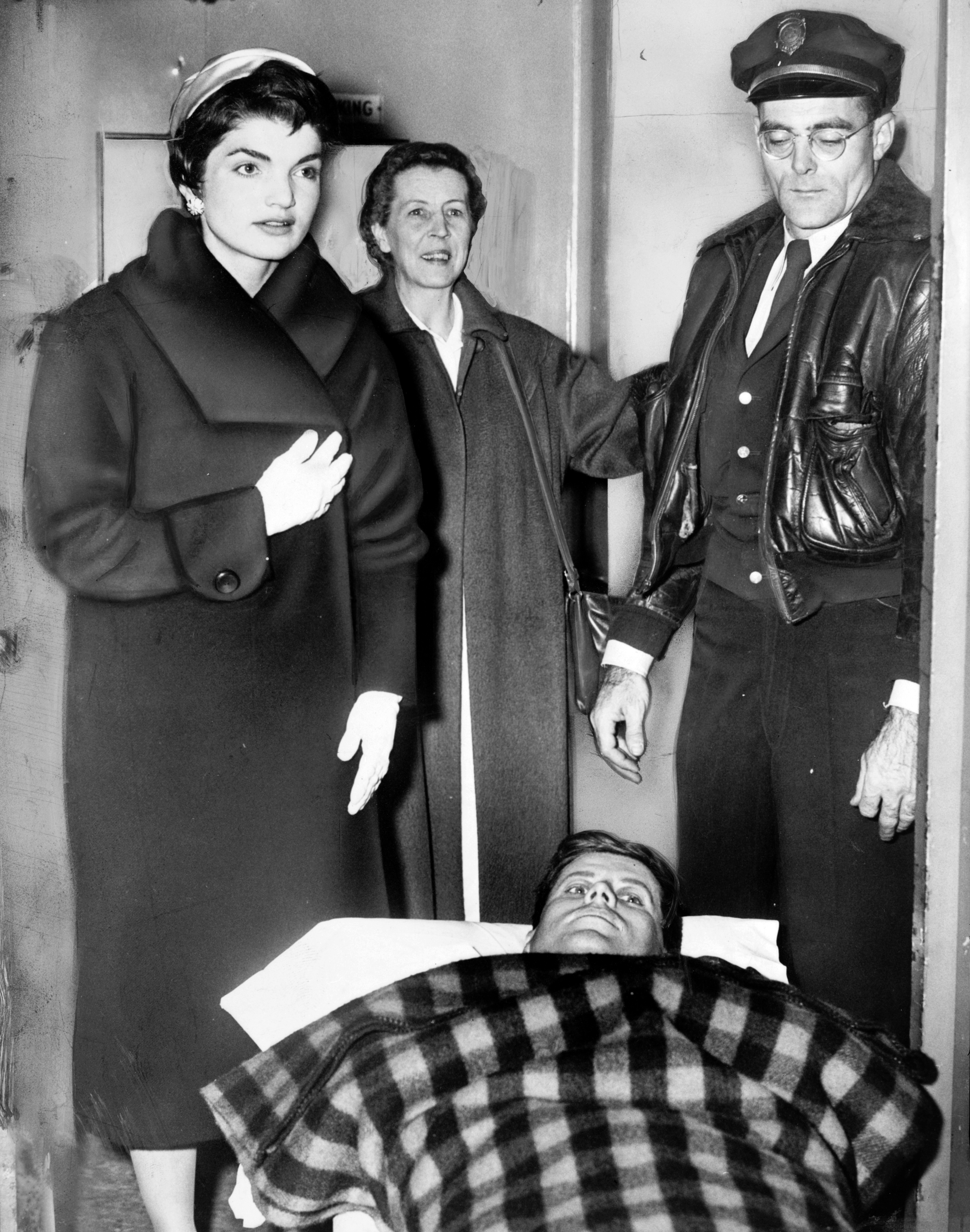
The Kennedys after John's spinal surgery, December 1954

The newlyweds honeymooned in Acapulco, Mexico, before settling in their new home, Hickory Hill in McLean, Virginia, a suburb of Washington, D.C. Kennedy developed a warm relationship with her parents-in-law, Joseph and Rose Kennedy. In the early years of their marriage, the couple faced several personal setbacks. John Kennedy suffered from Addison's disease and from chronic and at times debilitating back pain, which had been exacerbated by a war injury; in late 1954, he underwent a near-fatal spinal operation. Additionally, Jacqueline Kennedy suffered a miscarriage in 1955 and in August 1956 gave birth to a stillborn daughter, Arabella. They subsequently sold their Hickory Hill estate to Kennedy's brother Robert, who occupied it with his wife Ethel and their growing family, and bought a townhouse on N Street in Georgetown. The Kennedys also resided at an apartment at 122 Bowdoin Street in Boston, their permanent Massachusetts residence during John's congressional career. During this time, she wrote his statement of support for Adlai Stevenson II for president in the 1956 United States presidential election.

Kennedy gave birth to daughter Caroline on November 27, 1957. At the time, she and her husband were campaigning across Massachusetts for his re-election to the Senate, and they posed with their infant daughter for the cover of the April 21, 1958, issue of Life magazine. (Note: At first she had opposed the magazine's offer of the cover, not wanting the baby to be used to benefit her husband's political career, but she had changed her mind in exchange for a promise from her father-in-law that John would stop campaigning during the summer to go to Paris with her.) They traveled together during the campaign as part of their efforts to reduce the physical separation that had characterized the first five years of their marriage. Soon enough, John Kennedy started to notice the value his wife added to his congressional campaign. Kenneth O'Donnell remembered "the size of the crowd was twice as big" when she accompanied her husband; he also recalled her as "always cheerful and obliging". John's mother Rose, however, observed that Jacqueline was not "a natural-born campaigner" due to her shyness and was uncomfortable with too much attention. She cast her first-ever vote for his re-election campaign. In November 1958, John was reelected to a second term. He credited Jacqueline's visibility in the ads and stumping as vital assets in securing his victory and called her "simply invaluable". During his time in the Senate, she would often attend congressional hearings.

In July 1959, historian Arthur M. Schlesinger Jr. visited the Kennedy Compound in Hyannis Port, Massachusetts and had his first conversation with Jacqueline Kennedy; he found her to have "tremendous awareness, an all-seeing eye and a ruthless judgment". That year, John Kennedy traveled to 14 states, but Jacqueline took long breaks from the trips to spend time with their daughter, Caroline. She also counseled her husband on improving his wardrobe in preparation for the presidential campaign planned for the following year. In particular, she traveled to Louisiana to visit Edmund Reggie and to help her husband garner support in the state for his presidential bid.

== First Lady of the United States (1961–1963) ==
=== Campaign for presidency ===
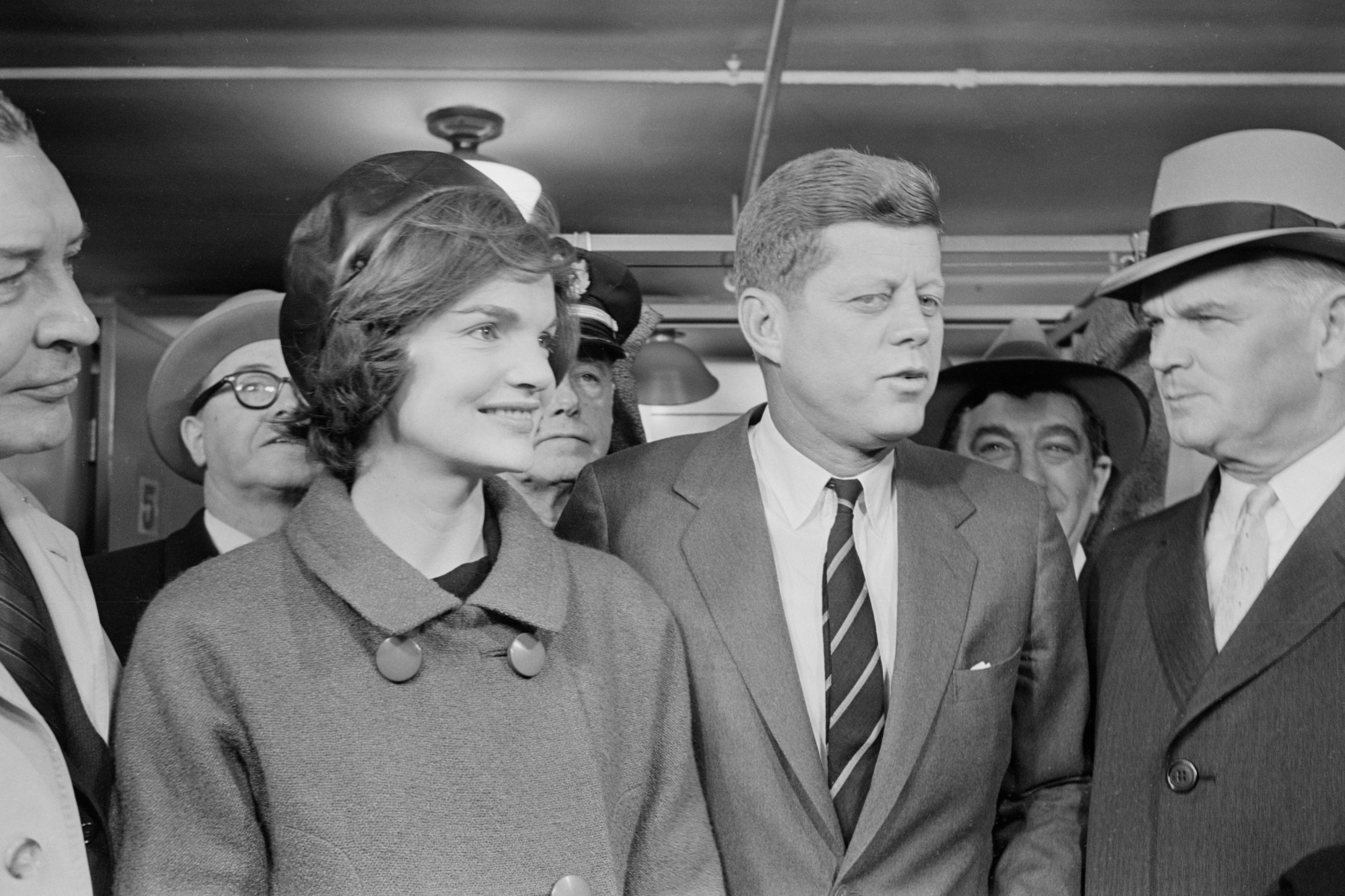
Kennedy and her husband voting at the Boston Public Library on Election Day, c. November 8, 1960

On January 2, 1960, John F. Kennedy, then a U.S. senator from Massachusetts, announced his candidacy for the presidency at the Russell Senate Office Building, and launched his campaign nationwide. In the early months of the election year, Jacqueline Kennedy accompanied her husband to campaign events such as whistle-stops and dinners. Shortly after the campaign began, she became pregnant. Due to her previous high-risk pregnancies, she decided to stay at home in Georgetown. Jacqueline subsequently participated in the campaign by writing a weekly syndicated newspaper column, "Campaign Wife", answering correspondence, and giving interviews to the media.

Despite her non-participation in the campaign, Kennedy became the subject of intense media attention with her fashion choices. On one hand, she was admired for her personal style; she was frequently featured in women's magazines alongside film stars and named as one of the 12 best-dressed women in the world. On the other hand, her preference for French designers and her spending on her wardrobe brought her negative press. In order to downplay her wealthy background, Kennedy stressed the amount of work she was doing for the campaign and declined to publicly discuss her clothing choices.

On July 13, at the 1960 Democratic National Convention in Los Angeles, the party nominated John F. Kennedy for president. Jacqueline did not attend the nomination due to her pregnancy, which had been publicly announced ten days earlier. She was in Hyannis Port when she watched the September 26, 1960 debate—which was the nation's first televised presidential debate—between her husband and Republican candidate Richard Nixon, who was the incumbent vice president. Marian Cannon, the wife of Arthur Schlesinger, watched the debate with her. Days after the debates, Jacqueline Kennedy contacted Schlesinger and informed him that John wanted his aid along with that of John Kenneth Galbraith in preparing for the third debate on October 13; she wished for them to give her husband new ideas and speeches. On September 29, 1960, the Kennedys appeared together for a joint interview on Person to Person, interviewed by Charles Collingwood.

=== As first lady ===
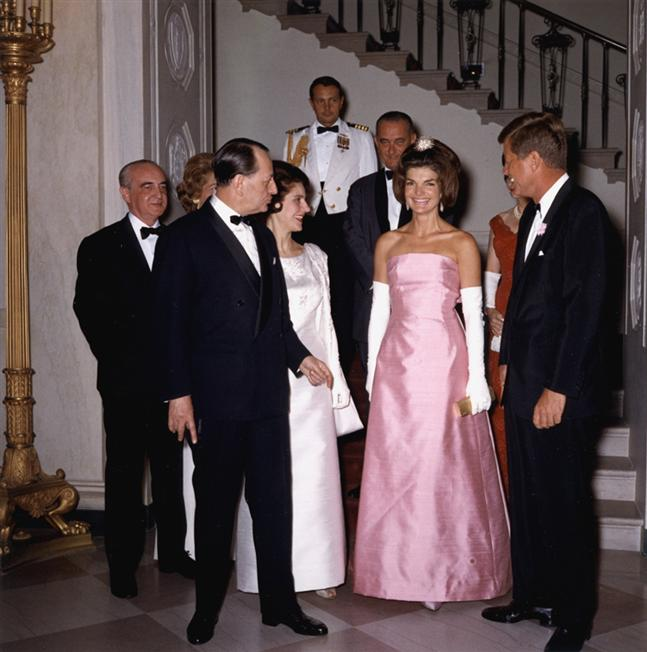
Jacqueline and John F. Kennedy, André and Marie-Madeleine Malraux, Lyndon B. and Claudia "Lady Bird" Johnson prior to a dinner, May 1962. Jacqueline Kennedy is wearing a gown designed by Oleg Cassini.

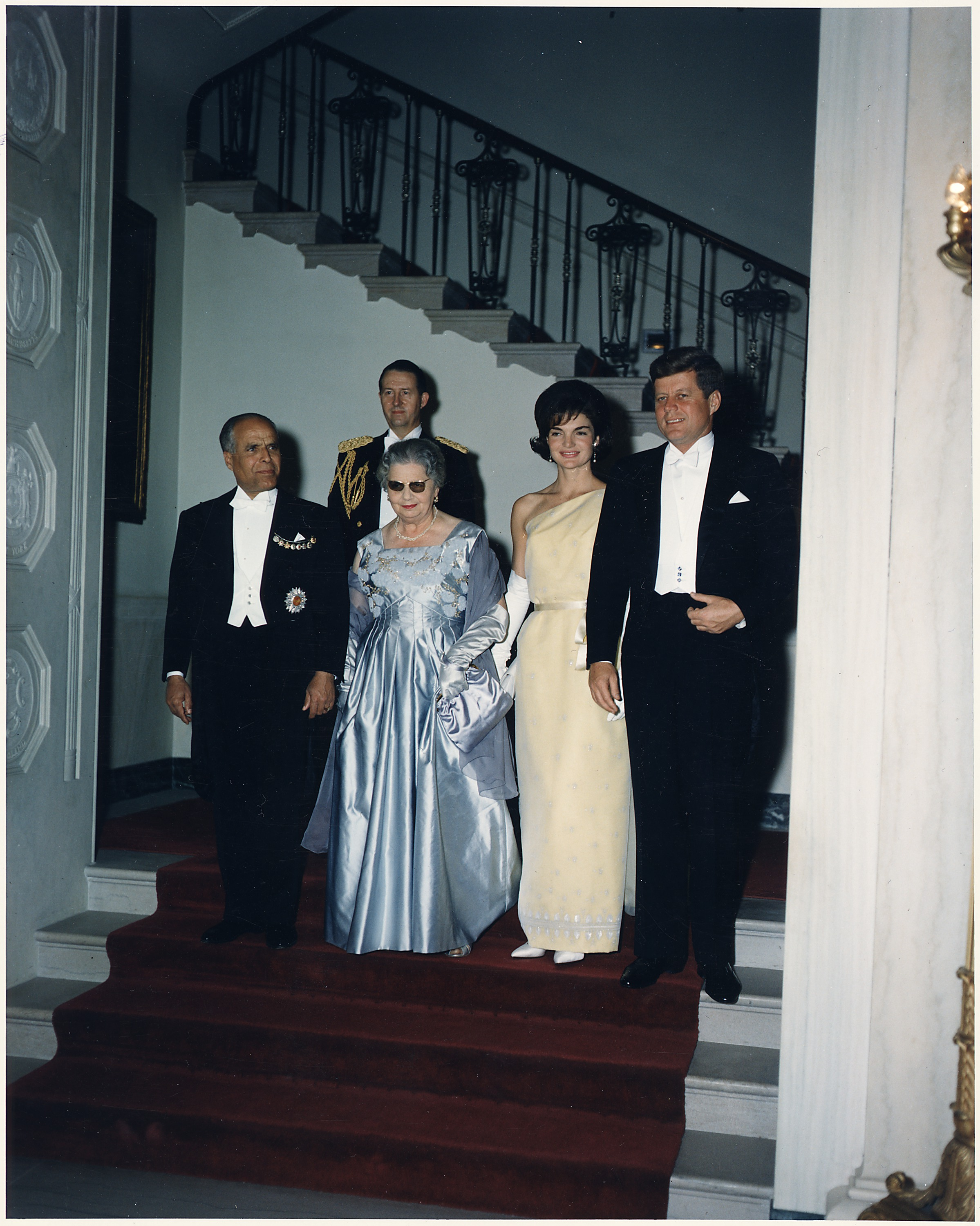
With Tunisian President Habib Bourguiba

On November 8, 1960, John F. Kennedy narrowly defeated Republican opponent Richard Nixon in the U.S. presidential election. A little over two weeks later on November 25, Jacqueline Kennedy gave birth to the couple's first son, John F. Kennedy Jr. She spent two weeks recuperating in the hospital, during which the most minute details of both her and her son's conditions were reported by the media in what has been considered the first instance of national interest in the Kennedy family. This birth via caesarean section is credited with normalizing it among the American people.

Kennedy's husband was sworn in as president on January 20, 1961. At 31, Kennedy was the third youngest woman to serve as first lady, as well as the first Silent Generation first lady. She insisted they also kept a family home away from the public eye and rented Glen Ora at Middleburg. As a presidential couple, the Kennedys differed from the Eisenhowers by their political affiliation, youth, and their relationship with the media. Historian Gil Troy has noted that in particular, they "emphasized vague appearances rather than specific accomplishments or passionate commitments" and therefore fit in well in the early 1960s' "cool, TV-oriented culture". The discussion about Kennedy's fashion choices continued during her years in the White House, and she became a trendsetter, hiring American designer Oleg Cassini to design her wardrobe. She was the first presidential wife to hire a press secretary, Pamela Turnure, and carefully managed her contact with the media, usually shying away from making public statements, and strictly controlling the extent to which her children were photographed. The media portrayed Kennedy as the ideal woman, which led academic Maurine Beasley to observe that she "created an unrealistic media expectation for first ladies that would challenge her successors". Nevertheless, she attracted worldwide positive public attention and gained allies for the White House and international support for the Kennedy administration and its Cold War policies.

Although Kennedy stated that her priority as a first lady was to take care of the president and their children, she also dedicated her time to the promotion of American arts and preservation of its history. The restoration of the White House was a main contribution, but she also furthered the cause by hosting social events that brought together elite figures from politics and the arts. One of her unrealized goals was to found a Department of the Arts, but she did contribute to the establishment of the National Endowment for the Arts and the National Endowment for the Humanities, established during Johnson's tenure. She is credited with lobbying, successfully, for Congress to fund the protection of Abu Simbel, and with convincing the United States Department of Labor to get involved in a dispute between the union and the Metropolitan Opera.

She was also actively involved in political affairs, and often attended United States National Security Council meetings: she is credited with advising her husband after crises including the Bay of Pigs Invasion, the Cuban Missile Crisis, and the Berlin Wall, and with urging him to adopt the nuclear test-ban treaty. She is also credited with insisting Robert McNamara send resources to help Italy after the 1962 Irpinia earthquake and pushing for a wheat deal that sold one hundred and fifty million bushels to the Soviet Union. According to John Kenneth Galbraith, the president's advisors "all respected and in some measure feared" her opinion.

==== White House restoration ====
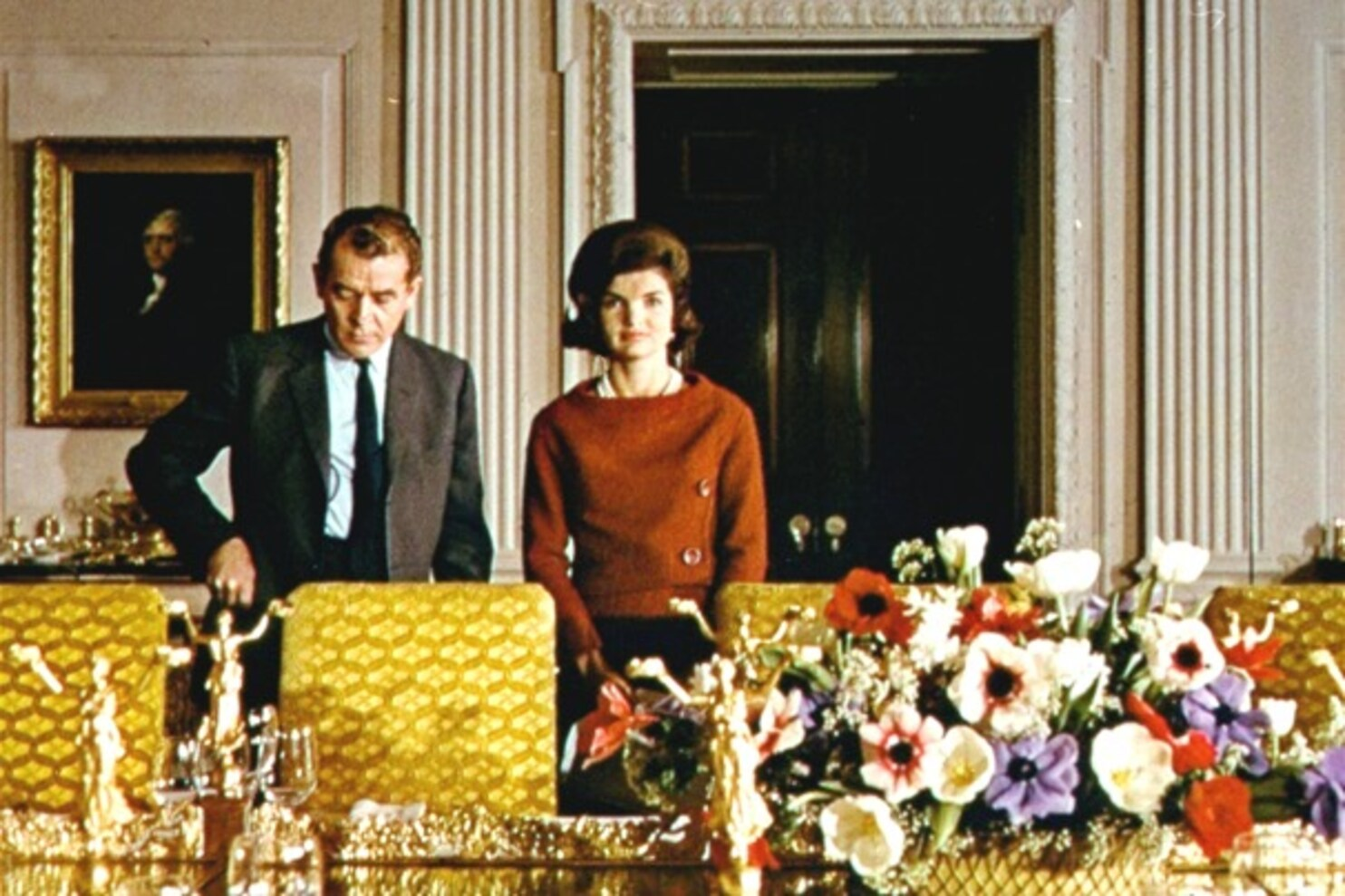
Kennedy with Charles Collingwood of CBS News during their televised tour of the restored White House in 1962

Kennedy had visited the White House on two occasions before she became first lady: the first time as a grade-school tourist in 1941 and again as the guest of outgoing first lady Mamie Eisenhower shortly before her husband's inauguration. She was dismayed to find that the mansion's rooms were furnished with undistinguished pieces that displayed little historical significance and made it her first major project as first lady to restore its historical character. On her first day in residence, she began her efforts with the help of interior decorator Sister Parish. She decided to make the family quarters attractive and suitable for family life by adding a kitchen on the family floor and new rooms for her children. The $50,000 that had been appropriated for this effort was almost immediately exhausted. Continuing the project, she established a fine arts committee to oversee and fund the restoration process and solicited the advice of early American furniture expert Henry du Pont. To solve the funding problem, a White House guidebook was published, sales of which were used for the restoration. Working with Rachel Lambert Mellon, Jacqueline Kennedy also oversaw the redesign and replanting of the White House Rose Garden and the East Garden, which was renamed the Jacqueline Kennedy Garden after her husband's assassination. In addition, Kennedy helped to stop the destruction of historic homes in Lafayette Square in Washington, D.C., because she felt these buildings were an important part of the nation's capital and played an essential role in its history. She helped to stop the destruction of historic buildings along the square, including the Renwick Building, now part of the Smithsonian Institution.

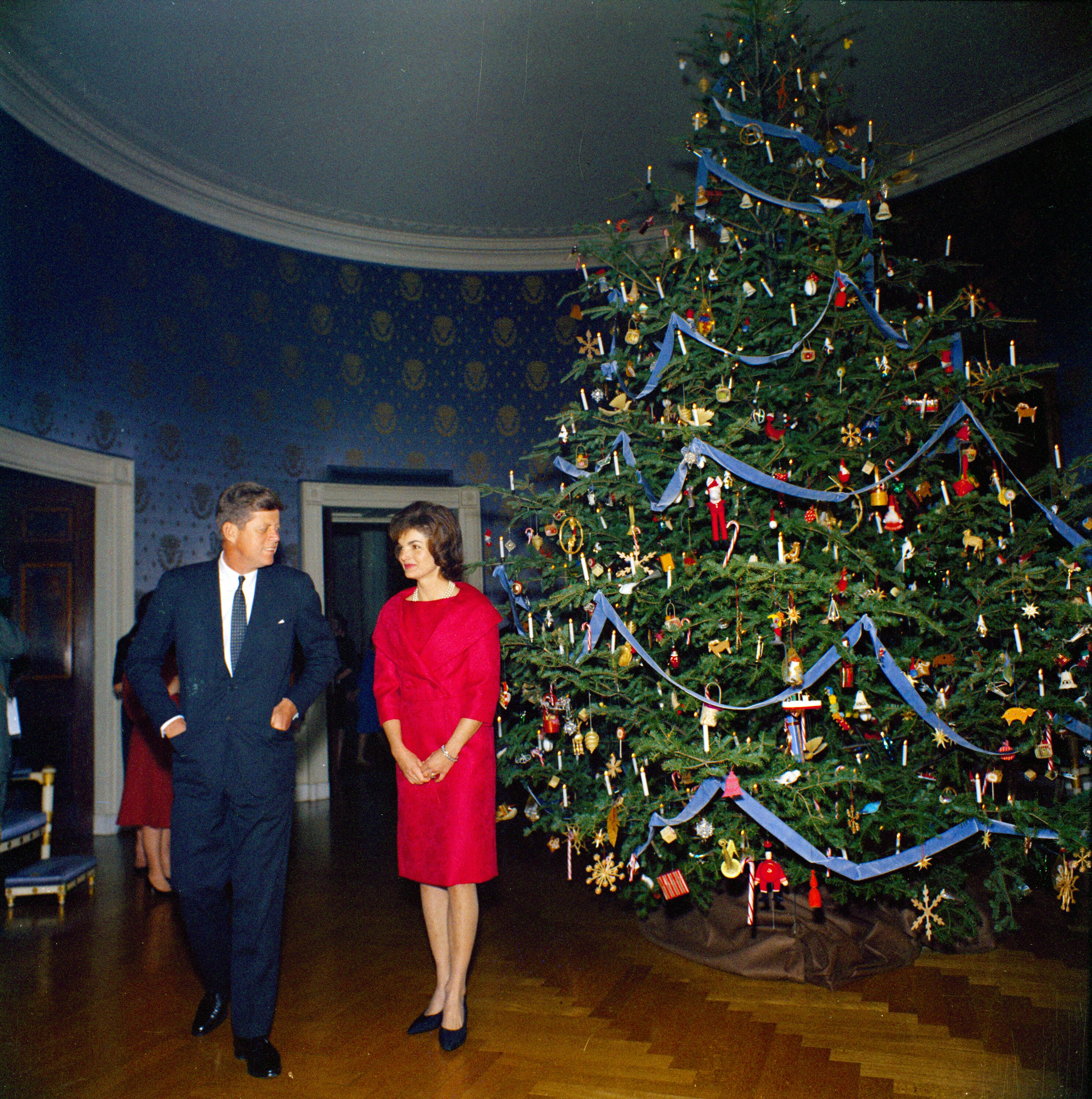
John and Jacqueline Kennedy at Christmas 1961

Prior to Kennedy's years as first lady, presidents and their families had taken furnishings and other items from the White House when they departed; this led to the lack of original historical pieces in the mansion. She personally wrote to possible donors in order to track down these missing furnishings and other historical pieces of interest. Jacqueline Kennedy initiated a Congressional bill establishing that White House furnishings would be the property of the Smithsonian Institution rather than available to departing ex-presidents to claim as their own. She also founded the White House Historical Association, the Committee for the Preservation of the White House, the position of a permanent Curator of the White House, the White House Endowment Trust, and the White House Acquisition Trust. She was the first presidential spouse to hire a White House curator.

On February 14, 1962, Jacqueline Kennedy, accompanied by Charles Collingwood of CBS News, took American television viewers on a tour of the White House. In the tour, she stated, "I feel so strongly that the White House should have as fine a collection of American pictures as possible. It's so important ... the setting in which the presidency is presented to the world, to foreign visitors. The American people should be proud of it. We have such a great civilization. So many foreigners don't realize it. I think this house should be the place we see them best." The film was watched by 56 million television viewers in the United States, and was later distributed to 106 countries. Kennedy won a special Academy of Television Arts & Sciences Trustees Award for it at the Emmy Awards in 1962, which was accepted on her behalf by Lady Bird Johnson. Kennedy was the only first lady to win an Emmy.

==== Foreign trips ====
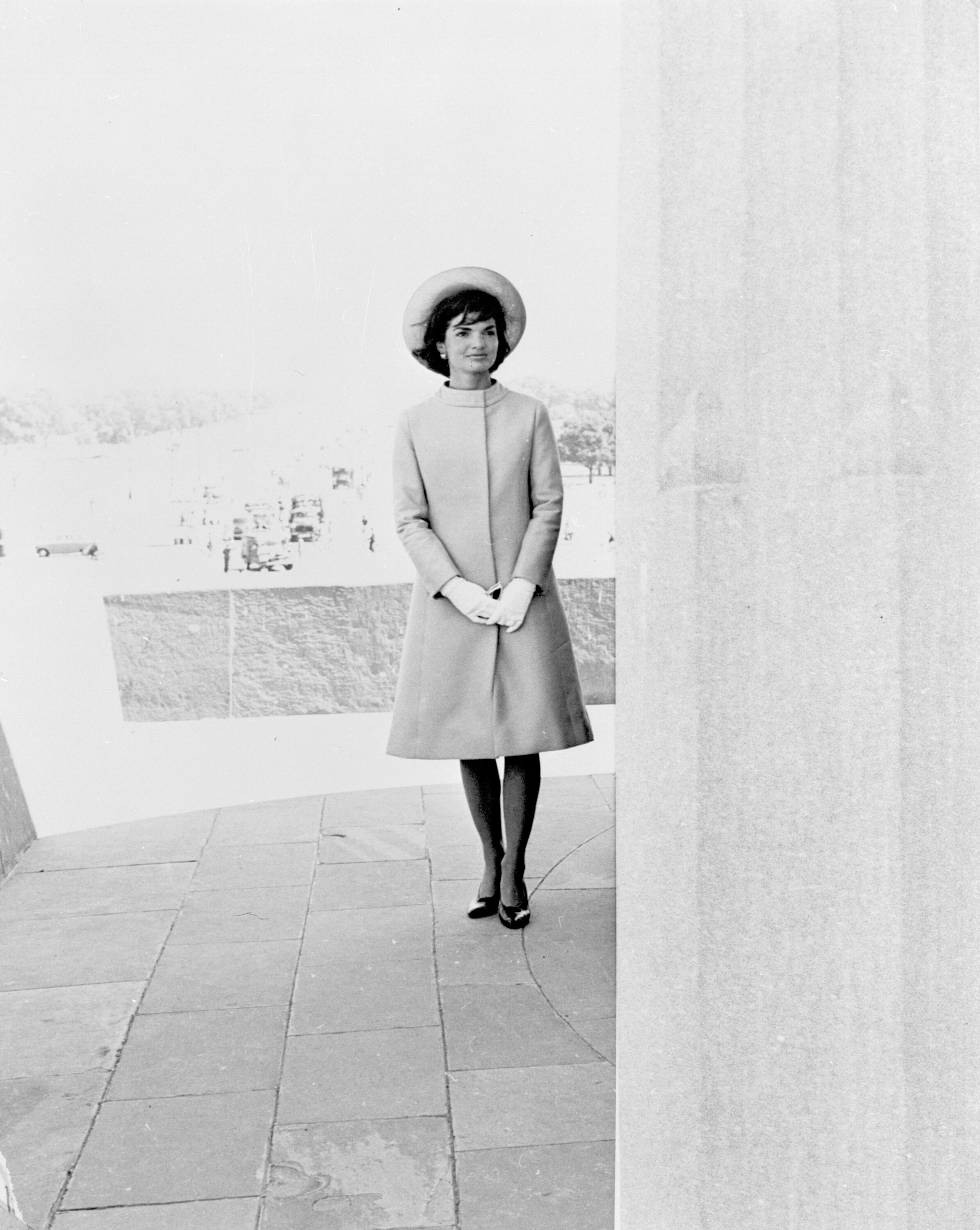
Jacqueline Kennedy at Vijay Chowk in New Delhi in March 1962

Jackie Kennedy was a cultural ambassador of the United States known for her cultural and diplomatic work globally and would travel sometimes without President Kennedy to different countries to promote cultural exchange and diplomatic relations. She was highly regarded by foreign dignitaries, as she used her fluency in foreign languages such as French, Spanish, and Italian, as well as her cultural knowledge, to establish strong relationships with foreign leaders and to give speeches. She was awarded the French Legion of Honor, the highest civilian award given by the French government, becoming the initial First Lady and first American woman to be such a recipient. Her role as a cultural ambassador had a significant impact on cultural diplomacy and helped strengthen ties between the United States and other countries.

Jacqueline's language skills and cultural knowledge were highly respected by the French people, and her visit to France with President Kennedy in 1961 was seen as a great success. During the visit, she made a speech in French at the American University of Paris, which was widely praised for its eloquence. In her speech, Jacqueline Kennedy spoke about the importance of cultural exchange between France and the United States, and she emphasized the shared values and history of the two nations.

Throughout her husband's presidency and more than any of the preceding first ladies, Kennedy made many official visits to other countries, on her own or with the President. Despite the initial worry that she might not have "political appeal", she proved popular among international dignitaries. Before the Kennedys' first official visit to France in 1961, a television special was shot in French with the First Lady on the White House lawn. After arriving in the country, she impressed the public with her ability to speak French, as well as her extensive knowledge of French history. At the conclusion of the visit, Time magazine seemed delighted with the First Lady and noted, "There was also that fellow who came with her." Even President Kennedy joked: "I am the man who accompanied Jacqueline Kennedy to Paris – and I have enjoyed it!"

From France, the Kennedys traveled to Vienna, Austria, where Soviet premier Nikita Khrushchev was asked to shake the president's hand for a photo. He replied, "I'd like to shake her hand first." Khrushchev later sent her a puppy, Pushinka; the animal was significant for being the offspring of Strelka, the dog that had gone to space during a Soviet space mission.

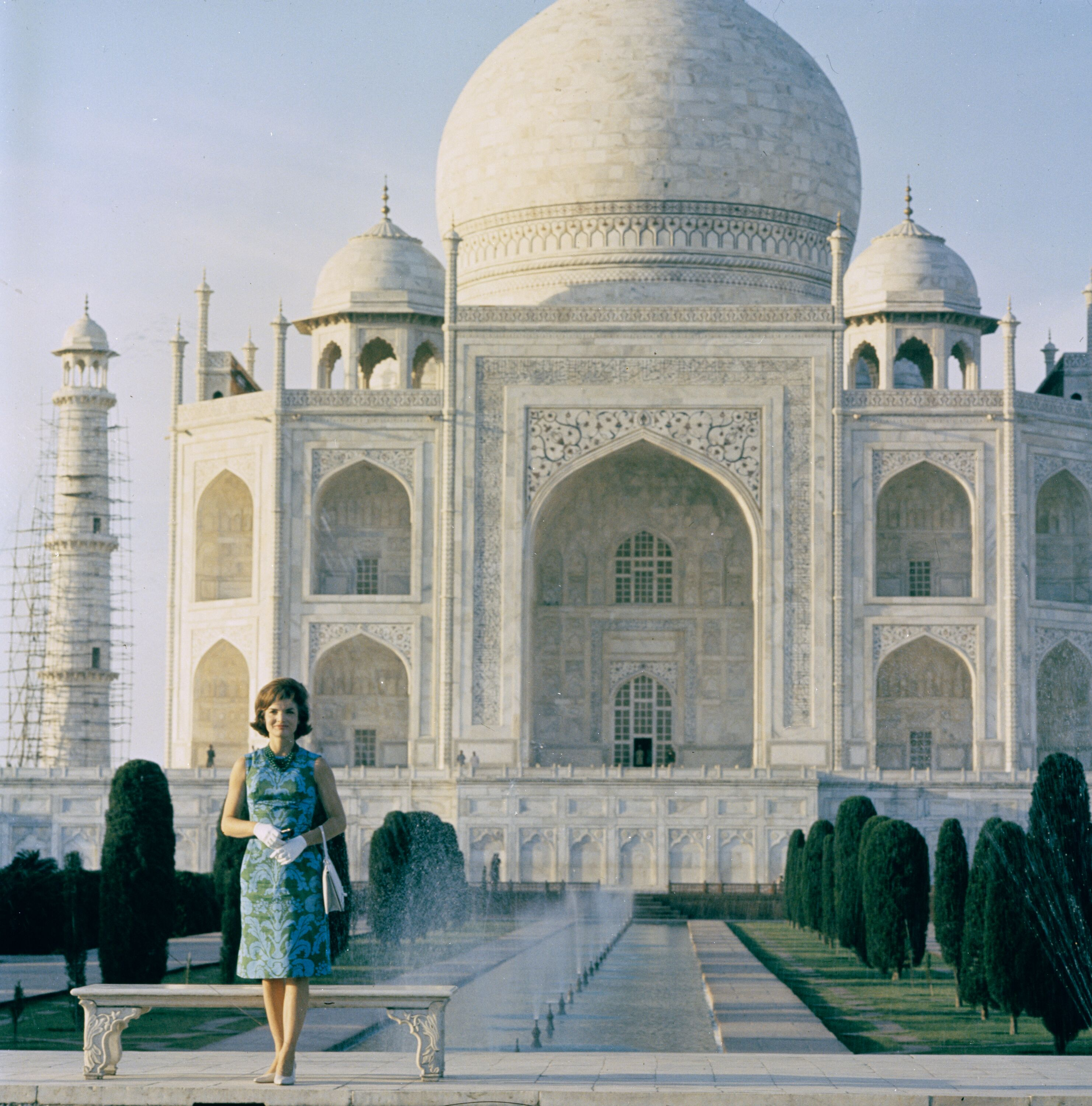
Kennedy at the Taj Mahal, Agra, Uttar Pradesh, India, March 1962

At the urging of U.S. ambassador to India John Kenneth Galbraith, Kennedy undertook a tour of India and Pakistan with her sister Lee Radziwill in 1962. The tour was amply documented in photojournalism as well as in Galbraith's journals and memoirs. The president of Pakistan, Ayub Khan, had given her a horse named Sardar as a gift. He had found out on his visit to the White House that he and the first lady had a common interest in horses. Life magazine correspondent Anne Chamberlin wrote that Kennedy "conducted herself magnificently" although noting that her crowds were smaller than those that President Dwight Eisenhower and Queen Elizabeth II attracted when they had previously visited these countries. In addition to these well-publicized trips during the three years of the Kennedy administration, she traveled to countries including Afghanistan, Austria, Canada, Colombia, United Kingdom, Greece, Italy, Mexico, Morocco, Turkey, and Venezuela. Unlike her husband, Kennedy was fluent in Spanish, which she used to address Latin American audiences.

==== Death of infant son ====
In early 1963, Kennedy was again pregnant, which led her to curtail her official duties. She spent most of the summer at a home she and the president had rented on Squaw Island, which was near the Kennedy compound on Cape Cod, Massachusetts. On August 7 (five weeks ahead of her scheduled due date), she went into labor and gave birth to a boy, Patrick Bouvier Kennedy, via emergency Caesarean section at nearby Otis Air Force Base. The infant's lungs were not fully developed, and he was transferred from Cape Cod to Boston Children's Hospital, where he died of hyaline membrane disease two days after birth. Kennedy had remained at Otis Air Force Base to recuperate after the Caesarean delivery; her husband went to Boston to be with their infant son and was present when he died. On August 14, the president returned to Otis to take her home and gave an impromptu speech to thank nurses and airmen who had gathered in her suite. In appreciation, she presented hospital staff with framed and signed lithographs of the White House.

The first lady was deeply affected by Patrick's death and entered a state of depression. However, the loss of their child had a positive impact on the marriage and brought the couple closer in their shared grief. Jacqueline Kennedy's friend Aristotle Onassis was aware of her depression and invited her to his yacht to recuperate. President Kennedy initially had reservations, but he relented because he believed that it would be "good for her". The trip was widely disapproved of within the Kennedy administration, by much of the general public, and in Congress. The First Lady returned to the United States on October 17, 1963. She would later say she regretted being away as long as she was but had been "melancholy after the death of my baby".

== Assassination and funeral of John F. Kennedy ==
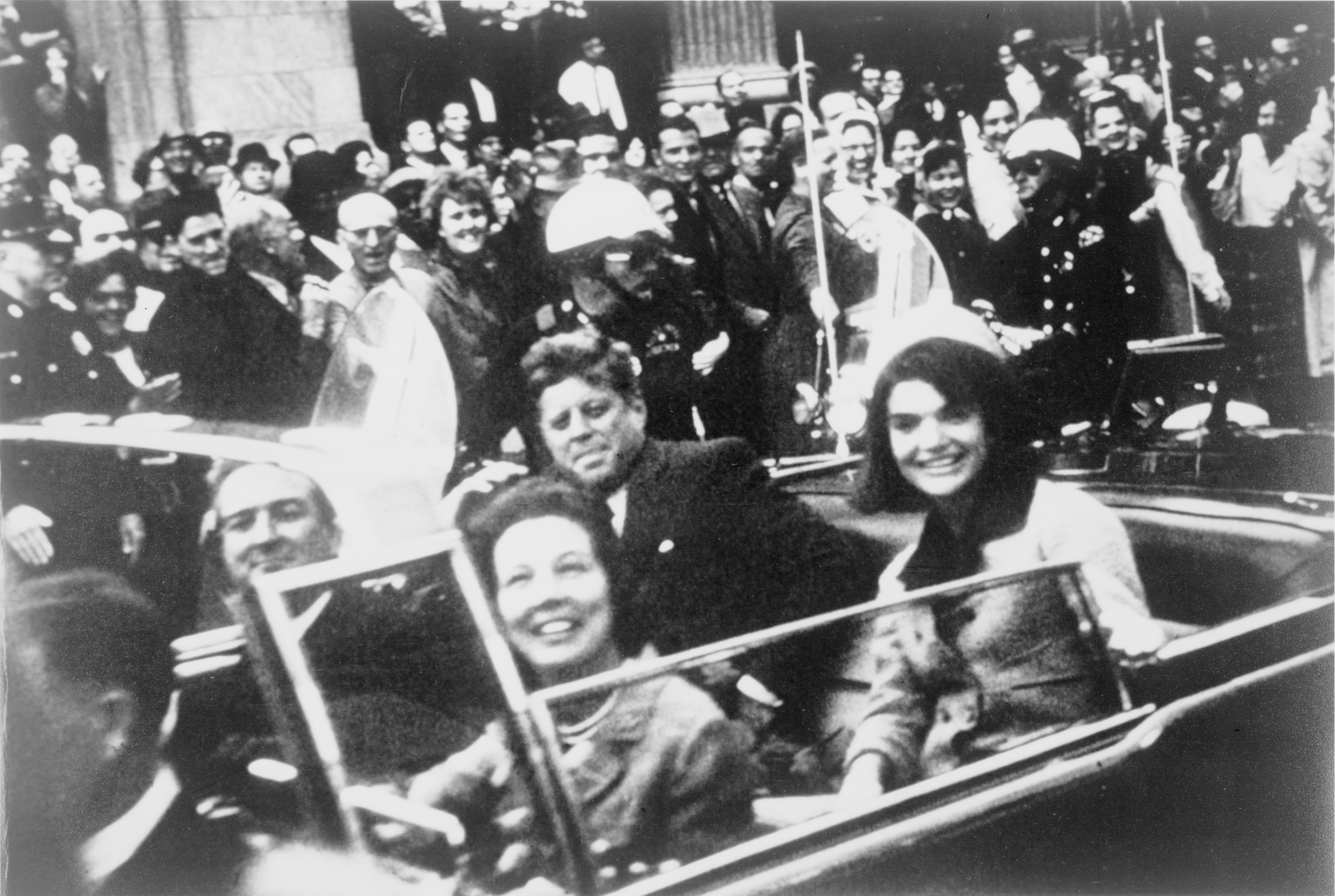
The president and first lady in the rear seat of the presidential state car minutes before the assassination

On November 21, 1963, the first lady and the president embarked on a political trip to Texas with several goals in mind. This was the first time that she had joined her husband on such a trip in the U.S. After a breakfast on November 22, they took a very short flight on Air Force One from Fort Worth's Carswell Air Force Base to Dallas's Love Field, accompanied by Texas Governor John Connally and his wife Nellie. The First Lady was wearing a bright pink Chanel suit and a pillbox hat, which had been personally selected by President Kennedy. A 9.5-mile (15.3 km) motorcade was to take them to the Trade Mart, where the president was scheduled to speak at a lunch. The first lady was seated to her husband's left in the third row of seats in the presidential car, with the Governor and his wife seated in front of them. Vice President Lyndon B. Johnson and his wife followed in another car in the motorcade.

After the motorcade turned the corner onto Elm Street in Dealey Plaza, the first lady heard what she thought to be a motorcycle backfiring. She did not realize that it was a gunshot until she heard Governor Connally scream. Within 8.4 seconds, two more shots had rung out, and one of the shots struck her husband in the head. Almost immediately, she began to climb onto the back of the limousine. Clinton J. Hill, Special Agent, Secret Service, ran to the car and leapt onto it, directing her back to her seat. As Hill stood on the back bumper, Associated Press photographer Ike Altgens snapped a photograph that was featured on the front pages of newspapers around the world. She would later testify that she saw pictures "of me climbing out the back. But I don't remember that at all".

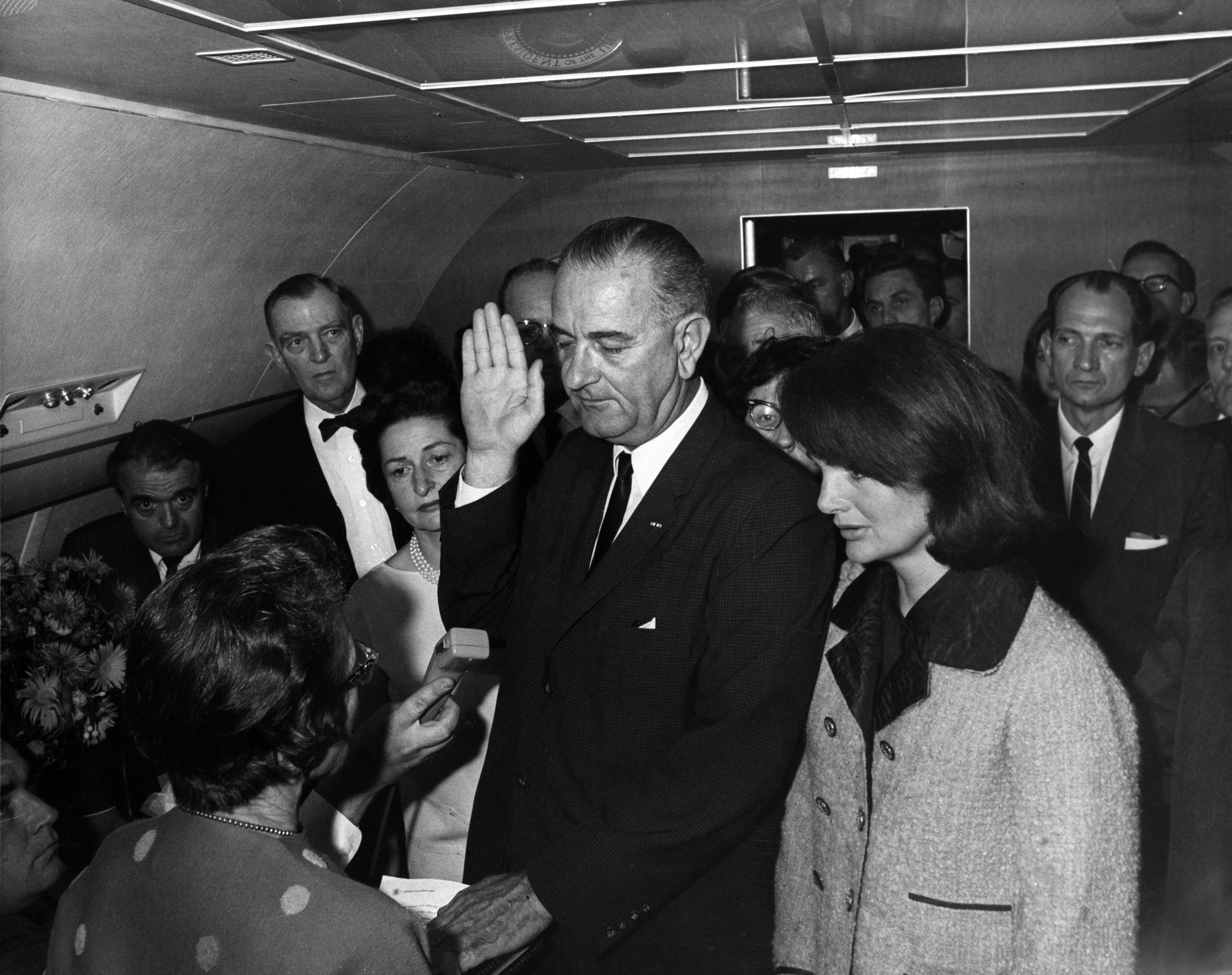
Kennedy, still wearing her blood-stained pink Chanel suit, stands alongside Lyndon B. Johnson as he takes the presidential oath of office administered by Sarah Hughes aboard Air Force One.

The president was rushed for the 3.8-mile (6.1 km) trip to Parkland Hospital. At the first lady's request, she was allowed to be present in the operating room. President Kennedy never regained consciousness. He died not long after, aged 46. After her husband was pronounced dead, Kennedy refused to remove her blood-stained clothing and reportedly regretted having washed the blood off her face and hands, explaining to Lady Bird Johnson that she wanted "them to see what they have done to Jack". She continued to wear the blood-stained pink suit as she boarded Air Force One and stood next to Johnson when he took the oath of office as president. The unlaundered suit became a symbol of her husband's assassination, and was donated to the National Archives and Records Administration in 1964. Under the terms of an agreement with her daughter, Caroline, the suit would not be placed on public display before 2103. Johnson's biographer Robert Caro wrote that Johnson wanted Jacqueline Kennedy to be present at his swearing-in in order to demonstrate the legitimacy of his presidency to JFK loyalists and to the world at large.

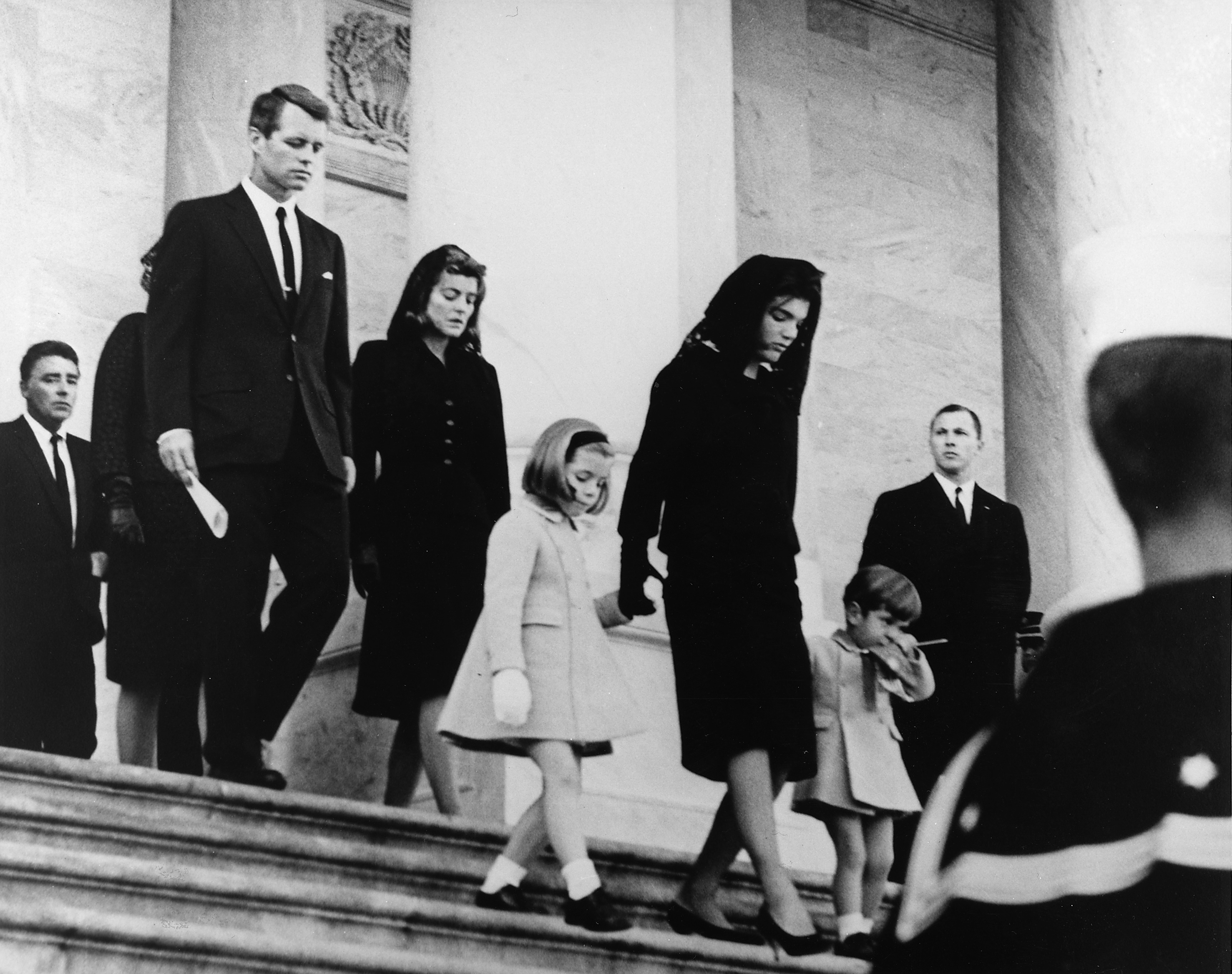
Family members depart the U.S. Capitol after a lying-in-state service for the President, November 24, 1963.

Kennedy took an active role in planning her husband's state funeral, modeling it after Abraham Lincoln's service. She requested a closed casket, overruling the wishes of her brother-in-law, Robert. The funeral service was held at the Cathedral of St. Matthew the Apostle in Washington D.C., with the burial taking place at nearby Arlington National Cemetery. Kennedy led the procession on foot and lit the eternal flame—created at her request—at the gravesite. Lady Jeanne Campbell reported back to the London Evening Standard: "Jacqueline Kennedy has given the American people ... one thing they have always lacked: Majesty."

A week after the assassination, new president Lyndon B. Johnson issued an executive order that established the Warren Commission—led by Chief Justice Earl Warren—to investigate the assassination. Ten months later, the Commission issued its report finding that Lee Harvey Oswald had acted alone when he assassinated President Kennedy. Privately, his widow cared little about the investigation, stating that even if they had the right suspect, it would not bring her husband back. Nevertheless, she gave a deposition to the Warren Commission. (Note: There were some mixed feelings about whether she should testify, Earl Warren in particular indicating an unwillingness to interview her while John J. McCloy outright opposed such an inquiry. Future president Gerald Ford, who served on the Warren Commission, proposed "most informally" having her interviewed by an associate. With the varying opinions of what to do lingering, Warren held a short meeting with Kennedy at her apartment.) Following the assassination and the media coverage that had focused intensely on her during and after the burial, Kennedy stepped back from official public view, apart from a brief appearance in Washington to honor the Secret Service agent, Clint Hill, who had climbed aboard the limousine in Dallas to try to shield her and the President.

== Life following the assassination (1963–1975) ==
=== The Camelot epitaph ===
Don't let it be forgot, that once there was a spot, for one brief, shining moment that was known as Camelot.

There'll be great presidents again ... but there will never be another Camelot.

— Kennedy describing the years of her husband's presidency for Life

On November 29, 1963—a week after her husband's assassination—Kennedy was interviewed in Hyannis Port by Theodore H. White of Life magazine. In that session, she compared the Kennedy years in the White House to King Arthur's mythical Camelot, commenting that the President often played the title song of Lerner and Loewe's musical recording before retreating to bed. She also quoted Queen Guinevere from the musical, trying to express how the loss felt.

The era of the John F. Kennedy's presidency has subsequently been referred to as the "Camelot Era" and "Camelot" became his presidency's epitaph. According to White, it sought to portray "a magic moment in American history, when gallant men danced with beautiful women, when great deeds were done, when artists, writers and poets met at the White House and the barbarians beyond the walls were held back". However, historians have later argued that the comparison was not appropriate, with Robert Dallek stating that Kennedy's "effort to lionize [her husband] must have provided a therapeutic shield against immobilizing grief". White himself would later admit the characterization was a "misreading of history". At the same time, Jackie Kennedy's effort to promote the myth of Camelot has been described as having "forever tied her family to the idea of royalty".

=== Mourning period and later public appearances ===
Kennedy and her children remained in the White House for two weeks following the assassination. Wanting to "do something nice for Jackie", President Johnson offered an ambassadorship to France to her, aware of her heritage and fondness for the country's culture, but she turned the offer down, as well as follow-up offers of ambassadorships to Mexico and the United Kingdom. At her request, Johnson renamed the Florida space center the John F. Kennedy Space Center a week after the assassination. Kennedy later publicly praised Johnson for his kindness to her.

Kennedy spent 1964 in mourning and made few public appearances. In the winter following the assassination, she and the children stayed at Averell Harriman's home in Georgetown. On January 14, 1964, Kennedy made a televised appearance from the office of the attorney general, thanking the public for the "hundreds of thousands of messages" she had received since the assassination, and said she had been sustained by America's affection for her late husband. She purchased a house for herself and her children in Georgetown but sold it later in 1964 and bought a 15th-floor penthouse apartment for $250,000 at 1040 Fifth Avenue in Manhattan in the hopes of having more privacy. During the summer of 1964, Kennedy retreated to Salutation in Glen Cove, Long Island.

In the following years, Kennedy attended selected memorial dedications to her late husband. (Note: In May 1965, she, Robert and Ted Kennedy joined Queen Elizabeth II at Runnymede, England, where they dedicated the United Kingdom's official memorial to JFK. The memorial included several acres of meadowland given in perpetuity from the UK to the US, near where King John had signed Magna Carta in 1215. In 1967, she attended the christening of the U.S. Navy aircraft carrier USS John F. Kennedy (CV-67) in Newport News, Virginia, a memorial in Hyannis Port, and a park near New Ross, Ireland. She also attended a private ceremony in Arlington National Cemetery that saw the moving of her husband's coffin, after which he was reinterred so that officials at the cemetery could construct a safer and more stable eternal flame and accommodate the tourists' extensive foot traffic.) She also oversaw the establishment of the John F. Kennedy Presidential Library and Museum, which is the repository for official papers of the Kennedy Administration. Designed by architect I.M. Pei, it is situated next to the University of Massachusetts campus in Boston.

Despite having commissioned William Manchester's authorized account of President Kennedy's death, The Death of a President, Kennedy was subject to significant media attention in 1966–1967 when she and Robert Kennedy tried to block its publication. They sued publishers Harper & Row in December 1966; the suit was settled the following year when Manchester removed passages that detailed President Kennedy's private life.

During the Vietnam War in November 1967, Life magazine dubbed Kennedy "America's unofficial roving ambassador" when she and David Ormsby-Gore, former British ambassador to the United States during the Kennedy administration, traveled to Cambodia, where they visited the religious complex of Angkor Wat with Chief of State Norodom Sihanouk. According to historian Milton Osborne, her visit was "the start of the repair to Cambodian-US relations, which had been at a very low ebb". She also attended the funeral services of Martin Luther King Jr. in Atlanta, Georgia, in April 1968, despite her initial reluctance due to the crowds and reminders of President Kennedy's death.

=== Relationship with Robert F. Kennedy ===
After her husband's assassination, Jacqueline Kennedy relied heavily on her brother-in-law Robert F. Kennedy; she observed him to be the "least like his father" of the Kennedy brothers. He had been a source of support after she had suffered a miscarriage early in her marriage; it was he, not her husband, who stayed with her in the hospital. In the aftermath of the assassination, Robert effectively became a surrogate father for her children until eventual demands by his own large family and his responsibilities as attorney general required him to reduce attention. He credited her with convincing him to stay in politics, and she supported his 1964 run for United States senator from New York.

The January 1968 Tet Offensive in Vietnam resulted in a drop in President Johnson's poll numbers, and Robert Kennedy's advisors urged him to enter the upcoming presidential race. When Art Buchwald asked him if he intended to run, Robert replied, "That depends on what Jackie wants me to do". She met with him around this time and encouraged him to run after she had previously advised him not to follow Jack, but to "be yourself". Privately, she worried about his safety; she believed that Bobby was more disliked than her husband had been and that there was "so much hatred" in the United States. She confided in him about these feelings, but by her own account, he was "fatalistic" like her. Despite her concerns, Jacqueline Kennedy campaigned for her brother-in-law and supported him, and at one point even showed outright optimism that through his victory, members of the Kennedy family would once again occupy the White House.

Just after midnight PDT on June 5, 1968, an enraged Jordanian gunman named Sirhan Sirhan mortally wounded Robert Kennedy minutes after he and a crowd of his supporters had been celebrating his victory in the California Democratic presidential primary. Jacqueline Kennedy rushed to Los Angeles to join his wife Ethel, her brother-in-law Ted, and the other Kennedy family members at his bedside in Good Samaritan Hospital. Robert Kennedy never regained consciousness and died the following day. He was 42 years old. After Bobby's death, Jacqueline Kennedy reportedly suffered a relapse of the depression she had suffered in the days following her husband's assassination nearly five years prior. She came to fear for her life and those of her two children, saying: "If they're killing Kennedys, then my children are targets ... I want to get out of this country."

=== Marriage to Aristotle Onassis ===
On October 20, 1968, Jacqueline Kennedy married her long-time friend Aristotle Onassis, a Greek shipping magnate who was able to provide the privacy and security she sought for herself and her children. The wedding took place on Skorpios, Onassis's private Greek island in the Ionian Sea. After marrying Onassis, she took the legal name Jacqueline Onassis and consequently lost her right to Secret Service protection, which is an entitlement of a widow of a U.S. president. The marriage brought her considerable adverse publicity. The fact that Aristotle was divorced and his former wife Athina Livanos was still living led to speculation that Jacqueline might be excommunicated by the Roman Catholic church, though that concern was explicitly dismissed by Boston's archbishop, Cardinal Richard Cushing, as "nonsense". She was condemned by some as a "public sinner", and became the target of paparazzi who followed her everywhere and nicknamed her "Jackie O".

In 1968, billionaire heiress Doris Duke, with whom Jacqueline Onassis was friends, appointed her as the vice president of the Newport Restoration Foundation. Onassis publicly championed the foundation.

During their marriage, Jacqueline and Aristotle Onassis inhabited six different residences: her 15-room Fifth Avenue apartment in Manhattan, her horse farm in Peapack-Gladstone, New Jersey, his Avenue Foch apartment in Paris, his private island Skorpios, his house in Athens, and his yacht Christina O. Onassis ensured that her children continued a connection with the Kennedy family by having Ted Kennedy visit them often. She developed a close relationship with Ted, and from then on he was involved in her public appearances.

Aristotle Onassis's health deteriorated rapidly following the death of his son Alexander in a plane crash in 1973. He died of respiratory failure aged 69 in Paris on March 15, 1975. His financial legacy was severely limited under Greek law, which dictated how much a non-Greek surviving spouse could inherit. After two years of legal wrangling, Jacqueline Onassis eventually accepted a settlement of $26 million from Christina Onassis—Aristotle's daughter and sole heir—and waived all other claims to the Onassis estate.

== Later years (1975–1990s) ==
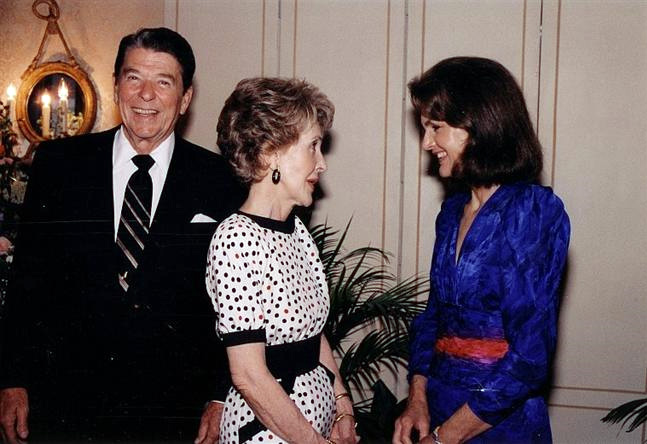
Onassis in 1985 with the president and first lady, Ronald and Nancy Reagan

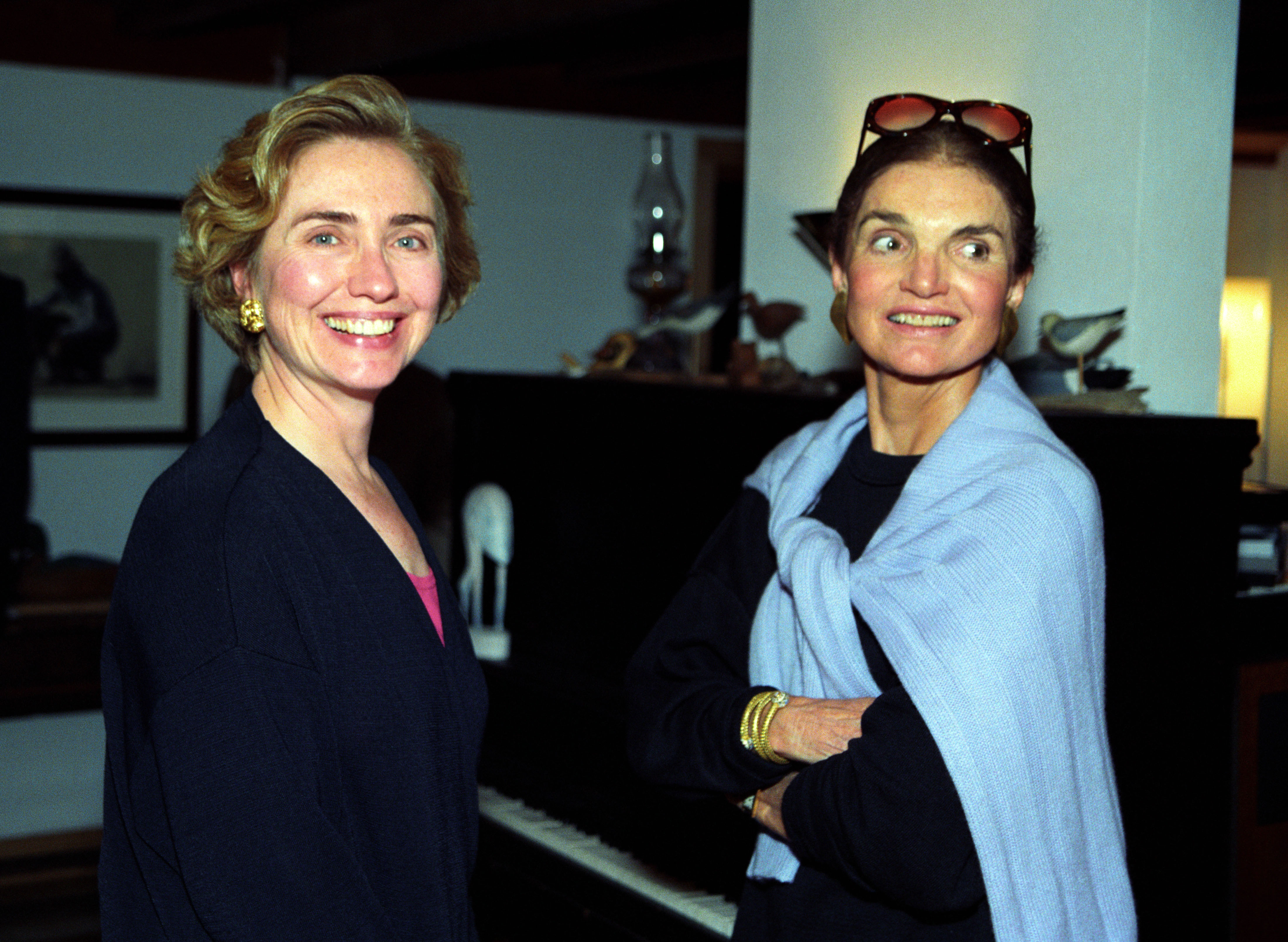
Onassis with Hillary Clinton in 1993

After the death of her second husband, Onassis returned permanently to the United States, splitting her time between Manhattan, Martha's Vineyard, and the Kennedy compound in Hyannis Port, Massachusetts. In 1975, she became a consulting editor at Viking Press, a position that she held for two years. (Note: Prior to her publishing employment, she had gained experience by being involved with several posthumous biographies of President Kennedy. The first of these was John F. Kennedy, President, by Hugh Sidey, which was published the year after his death in 1964. Simon Michael Bessie, Sidey's editor at Atheneum, recalled her as having read galleys and submitted detailed notes on them. Despite this recollection, Sidey did not acknowledge her contribution in the book. The following year, she helped Ted Sorensen with his book Kennedy. Sorensen told Greg Lawrence that after finishing the "first draft" of his "first big book", he gave Onassis the manuscript since he thought she would be helpful, and she provided him with several comments on the book. Sorensen lauded her assistance in his memoir Counselor, as he wrote that she had "proved to be a superb editor, correcting typographical errors, challenging mistaken assumptions, defending some of her husband's personnel decisions, suggesting useful clarifications, and repeatedly setting the record straight on matters not known to me".)

After almost a decade of avoiding participation in political events, Onassis attended the 1976 Democratic National Convention and stunned the assembled delegates when she appeared in the visitors' gallery. She resigned from Viking Press in 1977 after John Leonard of The New York Times stated that she held some responsibility for Viking's publication of the Jeffrey Archer novel Shall We Tell the President?, set in a fictional future presidency of Ted Kennedy and describing an assassination plot against him. Two years later, she appeared alongside her mother-in-law Rose Kennedy at Faneuil Hall in Boston when Ted Kennedy announced that he was going to challenge incumbent president Jimmy Carter for the Democratic nomination for president. She participated in the subsequent presidential campaign, which was unsuccessful.

Following her resignation from Viking Press, Onassis was hired by Doubleday, where she worked as an associate editor under an old friend, John Turner Sargent, Sr. Among the books she edited for the company are Larry Gonick's The Cartoon History of the Universe, the English translation of the three volumes of Naghib Mahfuz's Cairo Trilogy (with Martha Levin), and autobiographies of ballerina Gelsey Kirkland, singer-songwriter Carly Simon, and fashion icon Diana Vreeland. She also encouraged Dorothy West, her neighbor on Martha's Vineyard and one of the last surviving members of the Harlem Renaissance, to complete the novel The Wedding (1995), a multi-generational story about race, class, wealth, and power in the U.S. The book was later adapted as a miniseries in 1998, starring Halle Berry and Lynn Whitfield and produced by Oprah Winfrey's Harpo Productions.

As an editor for Doubleday, Onassis also persuaded top singer Michael Jackson to write his 1988 memoir Moonwalk. The book would be published by Doubleday, with Onassis serving as an editor for it as well. Though initially reluctant to do so, Onassis would also provide the Moonwalk's foreword as well. Moonwalk, which was later acknowledged to have had great input from both Onassis and the book's second manuscript writer Stephen Davis, would top the New York Times best seller list and sell 1 million copies by the end of its run. Despite being Michael Jackson's memoir, and the third and final manuscript being written by Jackson with editing assistance from Shaye Areheart, The Wall Street Journal stated in 2010 that Moonwalk was in fact Onassis' "most successful book," due to her prominent role in supervising its writing for Doubleday and managing its input.

In addition to her work as an editor, Onassis participated in cultural and architectural preservation. In the 1970s, she led a historic preservation campaign to save Grand Central Terminal from demolition and renovate the structure in Manhattan. A plaque inside the terminal acknowledges her prominent role in its preservation. In the 1980s, she was a major figure in protests against a planned skyscraper at Columbus Circle that would have cast large shadows on Central Park; the project was canceled. A later project proceeded despite protests: a large twin-towered skyscraper, the Time Warner Center, was completed in 2003. Her historic preservation efforts also include her influence in the campaign to save Olana, the home of Frederic Edwin Church in upstate New York. She was awarded the Fine Arts Federation medal for her devotion to the cause of historic preservation in New York City.

Onassis remained the subject of considerable press attention, especially from the paparazzi photographer Ron Galella, who followed her around and photographed her as she went about her normal activities; he took candid photos of her without her permission. She ultimately obtained a restraining order against him, and the situation brought attention to the problem of paparazzi photography. (Note: In the mid-1970s, photos of Onassis sunbathing in the nude had been published without her permission in the pornographic magazines Playmen, Screw, and Hustler.) From 1980 until her death, Onassis maintained a close relationship with Maurice Tempelsman, a Belgian-born industrialist and diamond merchant who was her companion and personal financial adviser. Tempelsman and his wife Lilly had previously been frequent guests at the White House during the Kennedy Administration. Details of their romance received limited, if any, media coverage until the short time after Onassis's death in May 1994, with the New York Times even noting that Tempelsman had been "quietly at her side" even toward the end of her life and didn't go "public" until afterwards; even by 1989, Tempelsman was described as a "public escort and private companion" who only "stayed several nights a week in Onassis's Fifth Avenue Apartment" rather than living there full time. In the July 11, 1994 edition of People, it was revealed that Tempelsman had in fact been living in Onassis's Fifth Avenue home since 1988; by this time, Onassis had in fact been living a more private life. Despite separating from his wife in 1984, Tempelsman remained legally married to Lilly throughout his relationship with Onassis.

In 1988, Onassis became a first-time grandmother when her daughter Caroline – married to designer Edwin Schlossberg – gave birth to daughter Rose, followed by Tatiana Celia (1990–2025) and John Bouvier (b. 1993). Caroline would later recall: "I have never seen her so happy as when she's around the kids."

In the early 1990s, Onassis supported Bill Clinton and contributed money to his presidential campaign. Following the election, she met with First Lady Hillary Clinton and advised her on raising a child in the White House. In her memoir Living History, Clinton wrote that Onassis was "a source of inspiration and advice for me". Democratic consultant Ann Lewis observed that Onassis had reached out to the Clintons "in a way she has not always acted toward leading Democrats in the past".

== Illness, death, and funeral ==
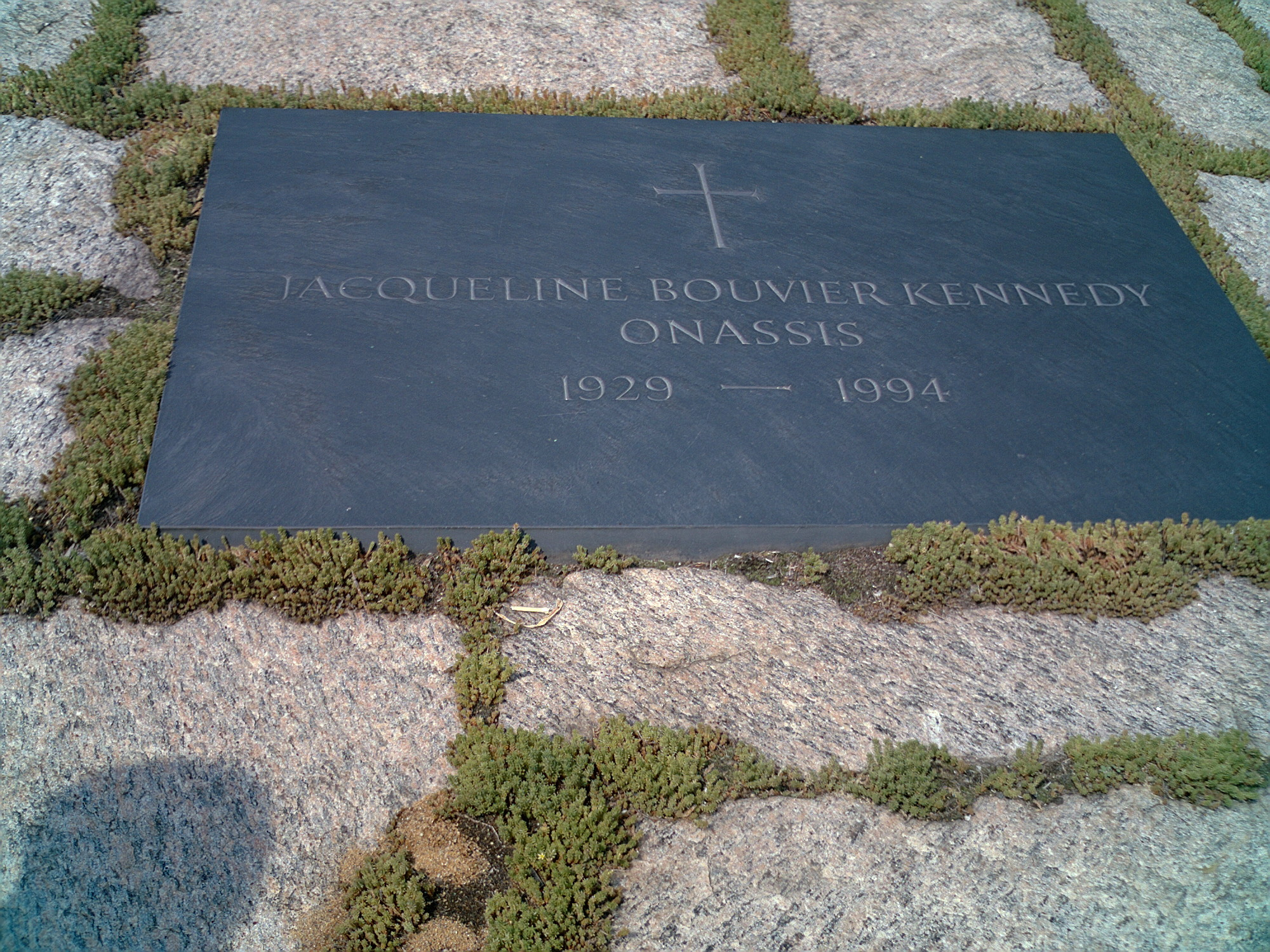
Onassis's grave at Arlington National Cemetery

In November 1993, Onassis was thrown from her horse while participating in a fox hunt in Middleburg, Virginia, and was taken to the hospital for examination. A swollen lymph node was discovered in her groin, which was initially diagnosed by the doctor to be caused by an infection. The fall from the horse contributed to her deteriorating health over the next six months. In December, Onassis developed new symptoms, including a stomach ache and swollen lymph nodes in her neck, and was diagnosed with non-Hodgkins lymphoma. She began chemotherapy in January 1994 and publicly announced the diagnosis, saying the initial prognosis was good. She continued to work at Doubleday, but by March the cancer had spread to her spinal cord, brain and liver, and by May it was deemed terminal.

Onassis made her last trip home from New York Hospital–Cornell Medical Center on May 18, 1994. The following night at 10:15 p.m., she died in her sleep at her Manhattan apartment at age 64, with her children by her side. In the morning, her son, John F. Kennedy Jr., announced his mother's death to the press saying she had been "surrounded by her friends and her family and her books, and the people and the things that she loved". He added that "she did it in her very own way, and on her own terms, and we all feel lucky for that."

On May 23, her funeral Mass was held a few blocks away from her apartment at the Church of St. Ignatius Loyola—the Catholic parish where she was baptized in 1929 and confirmed as a teenager—and asked for no cameras to film the event, for privacy. She was interred at Arlington National Cemetery in Arlington, Virginia, alongside President Kennedy, their son Patrick, and their stillborn daughter Arabella. President Bill Clinton delivered a eulogy at her graveside service.

She left an estate that its executors valued at US$43.7 million (equivalent to $94.9 million in 2025).

== Legacy ==
=== Popularity ===
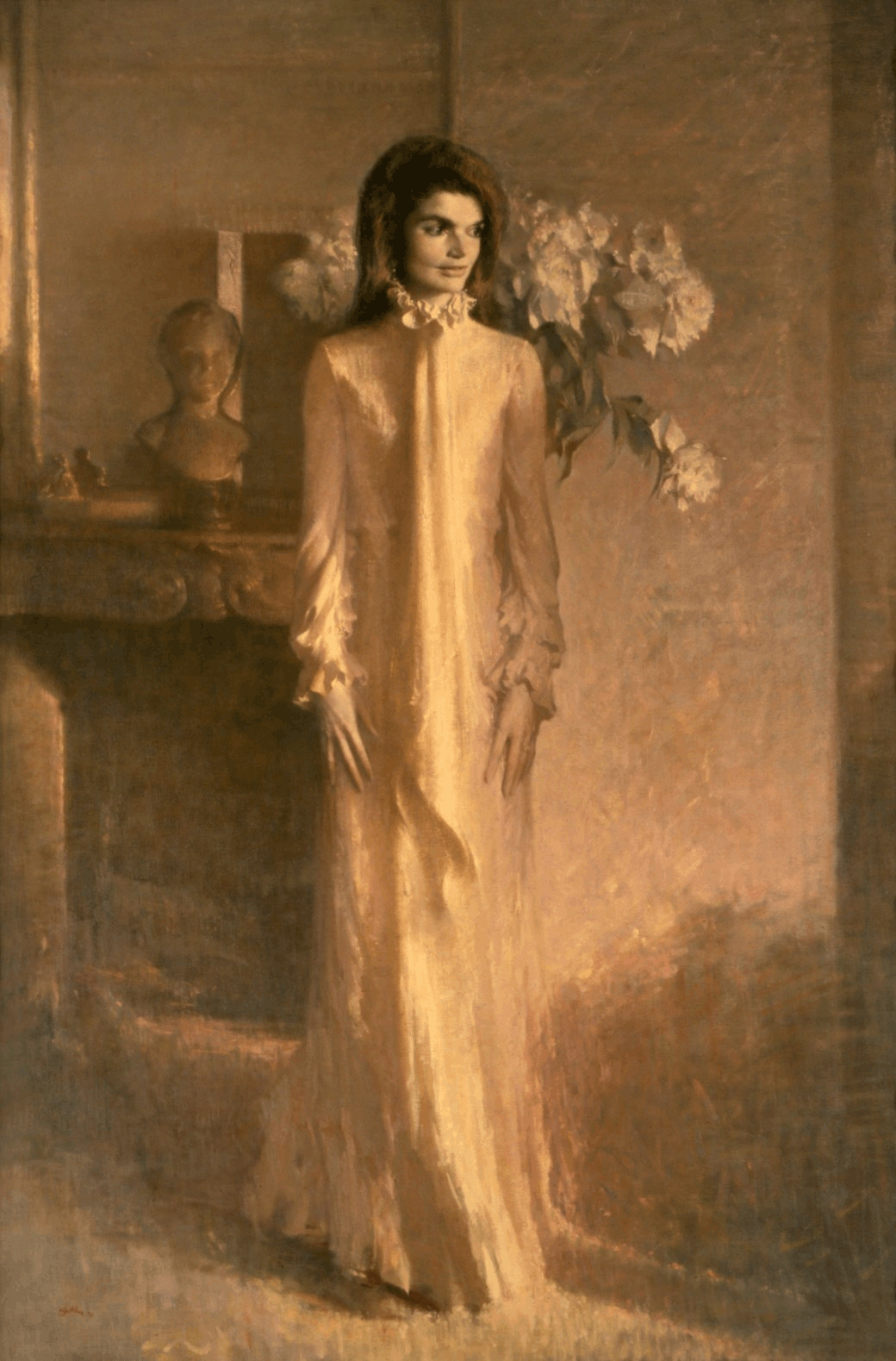
Official portrait of Kennedy at the White House. Her pleated linen dress was designed by Irish fashion designer Sybil Connolly.

Jacqueline Kennedy's marriage to Aristotle Onassis caused her popularity to decline sharply among an American public who viewed it as a betrayal of the assassinated president. Her lavish lifestyle as Onassis's "trophy wife", in contrast to "the shy, selfless, and sacrificing mother the American public had come to respect" as First Lady, led the press to portray her as "a spendthrift and a reckless woman".

Onassis took conscious control of her public image and, by the time of her death, succeeded in rehabilitating it. By moving back to New York City after Onassis's death, working as an editor for Viking Press and Doubleday, focusing on her children and grandchildren, and participating in charitable causes, she reversed her "reckless spendthrift" image. She also reestablished her relationship with the Kennedy family and supported the John F. Kennedy Library and Museum.

Onassis remains one of the most popular First Ladies. She was featured 27 times on the annual Gallup list of the top 10 most admired people of the second half of the 20th century; this number is surpassed by only Billy Graham and Queen Elizabeth II and is higher than that of any U.S. president.

People that have cited Onassis as an influence include Tina Turner, Jackie Joyner-Kersee,

=== Style icon ===
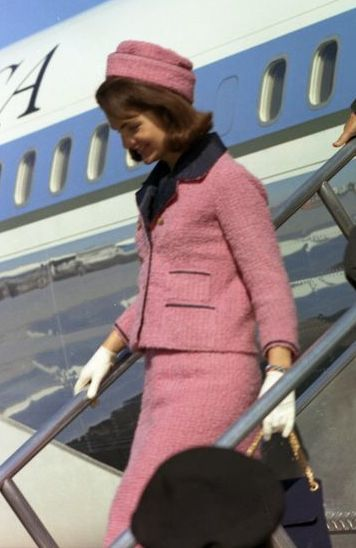
Kennedy wearing her pink Chanel suit

Jacqueline Kennedy became a global fashion icon during her husband's presidency. After the 1960 election, she commissioned French-born American fashion designer and Kennedy family friend Oleg Cassini to create an original wardrobe for her appearances as First Lady. From 1961 to 1963, Cassini dressed her in many of her ensembles, including her Inauguration Day fawn coat and Inaugural gala gown, as well as many outfits for her visits to Europe, India, and Pakistan. In 1961, Kennedy spent $45,446 more on fashion than the $100,000 annual salary her husband earned as president.

Kennedy preferred French couture, particularly the work of Chanel, Balenciaga, and Givenchy, but was aware that in her role as first lady, she would be expected to wear American designers' work. After noticing that her taste for Paris fashion was being criticized in the press, she wrote to the fashion editor Diana Vreeland to ask for suitable American designers, particularly those who could reproduce the Paris look. After considering the letter, which expressed her dislike of prints and her preference for "terribly simple, covered-up clothes," Vreeland recommended Norman Norell, who was considered America's first designer and known for his high-end simplicity and fine quality work. She also suggested Ben Zuckerman, another highly regarded tailor who regularly offered re-interpretations of Paris couture, and the sportswear designer Stella Sloat, who occasionally offered Givenchy copies. Kennedy's first choice for her Inauguration Day coat was originally a purple wool Zuckerman model that was based on a Pierre Cardin design, but she instead settled on a fawn Cassini coat and wore the Zuckerman for a tour of the White House with Mamie Eisenhower.

In her role as first lady, Kennedy preferred to wear clean-cut suits with a skirt hem down to middle of the knee, three-quarter sleeves on notch-collar jackets, sleeveless A-line dresses, above-the-elbow gloves, low-heel pumps, and pillbox hats. Dubbed the "Jackie" look, these clothing items rapidly became fashion trends in the Western world. More than any other First Lady, her style was copied by commercial manufacturers and a large segment of young women. Her influential bouffant hairstyle, described as a "grown-up exaggeration of little girls' hair," was created by Mr. Kenneth, who worked for her from 1954 until 1986. Her tastes in eyewear were also influential, the most famous of which were the bespoke pairs designed for her by French designer, François Pinton. The coinage 'Jackie O glasses' is still used today to refer to this style of oversized, oval-lensed sunglasses.

She is credited with popularizing Valentino internationally; she wore six custom dresses of his in the year after her husband's assassination, and he also designed her wedding dress to Onassis.

After leaving the White House, Kennedy underwent a style change. Her new looks consisted of wide-leg pantsuits, silk Hermès headscarves, and large, round, dark sunglasses. She began wearing jeans in public as part of a casualization of her look.

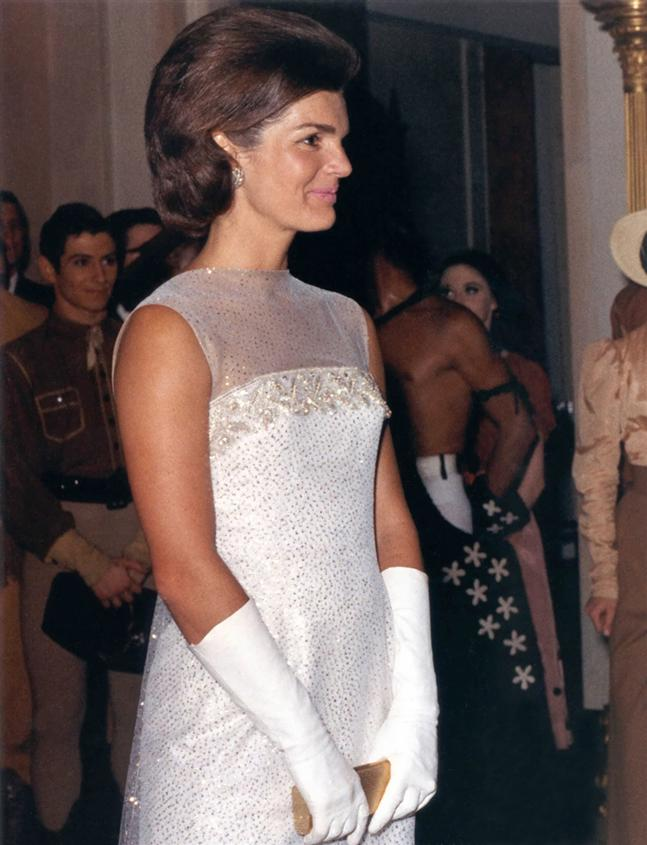
Kennedy at a State dinner on May 22, 1962

Kennedy acquired a large collection of jewelry throughout her lifetime. Her triple-strand pearl necklace, designed by American jeweler Kenneth Jay Lane, became her signature piece of jewelry during her time as first lady in the White House. Often referred to as the "berry brooch", the two-fruit cluster brooch of strawberries made of rubies with stems and leaves of diamonds, designed by French jeweler Jean Schlumberger for Tiffany & Co., was personally selected and given to her by her husband several days prior to his inauguration in January 1961. She wore Schlumberger's gold and enamel bracelets so frequently in the 1960s that the press called them "Jackie bracelets". Kennedy wore jewelry designed by Van Cleef & Arpels throughout the 1950s, 1960s, and 1970s; her most well-known individual jewelry piece was the Van Cleef & Arpels engagement ring given to her by President Kennedy. On her 40th birthday, she received earrings themed around the moon landing from Onassis, and would go on to continue wearing them. She was also known for wearing a mantilla at Mass and in the presence of the Pope.

Mary Tyler Moore's Dick Van Dyke Show character Laura Petrie, who symbolized the "feel-good nature" of the Kennedy White House, often dressed like Kennedy.

Kennedy was named to the International Best Dressed List Hall of Fame in 1965. Many of her signature clothes are preserved at the John F. Kennedy Library and Museum; pieces from the collection were exhibited at the Metropolitan Museum of Art in New York in 2001. Titled "Jacqueline Kennedy: The White House Years", the exhibition focused on her time as a first lady.

In 2012, Time magazine included Jacqueline Kennedy Onassis on its All-TIME 100 Fashion Icons list. In 2016, Forbes included her on the list "10 Fashion Icons and the Trends They Made Famous".

=== Historical assessments ===
In 2020, Time magazine included her name on its list of 100 Women of the Year. She was named Woman of the Year 1962 for her efforts in uplifting American history and art.

Jacqueline Kennedy Onassis is seen as being customary in her role as first lady, though Frank N. Magill argued that her life was validation that "fame and celebrity" changed the way that first ladies are evaluated historically. Hamish Bowles, curator of the "Jacqueline Kennedy: The White House Years" exhibit at the Metropolitan Museum of Art, attributed her popularity to a sense of unknown that was felt in her withdrawal from the public which he dubbed "immensely appealing". After her death, Kelly Barber referred to Jacqueline Kennedy Onassis as "the most intriguing woman in the world", furthering that her stature was also due to her affiliation with valuable causes. Historian Carl Sferrazza Anthony summarized that the former first lady "became an aspirational figure of that era, one whose privilege might not be easily reached by a majority of Americans but which others could strive to emulate". Since the late 2000s, Onassis's traditional persona has been invoked by commentators when referring to fashionable political spouses. A wide variety of commentators have positively credited the work of Jacqueline Kennedy Onassis in restoring the White House, including Hugh Sidey, Letitia Baldrige, Laura Bush, Kathleen P. Galop, and Carl Anthony.

Since 1982, Siena Research Institute has periodically conducted surveys asking historians to assess American first ladies according to a cumulative score on the independent criteria of their background, value to the country, intelligence, courage, accomplishments, integrity, leadership, being their own women, public image, and value to the president. Consistently, Onassis has ranked between the third and eighth most highly regarded first ladies in these surveys. In terms of cumulative assessment, Onassis has been ranked:

- 8th-best of 42 in 1982
- 7th-best of 37 in 1993
- 4th-best of 38 in 2003
- 3rd-best of 38 in 2008
- 3rd-best of 39 in 2014
- 4th-best of 40 in 2020

In the 2008 Siena Research Institute survey, Onassis was ranked in the top-five of all criteria, ranking the 2nd-highest in background, 4th-highest in intelligence, 2nd-highest in value to the country, 4th-highest in being her "own woman", 4th-highest in integrity, 5th-highest in her accomplishments, 2nd-highest in courage, 4th-highest in leadership, 1st in public image, and 3rd-highest in her value to the president. In the 2003 survey, Onassis made the top-five in half of the categories, being ranked 1st-highest in background, 5th-highest in intelligence, 4th-highest in courage, 4th-highest in value to the country, and 1st-highest in public image. In the 2014 Siena Research Institute survey, in the rankings of 20th and 21st century American first ladies in additional survey questions, Onassis was ranked 2nd-highest for management of family life, 4th-highest for advancement of women's issues, 3rd-greatest as a political asset, 4th-strongest public communicator, and 2nd-highest for creation of a lasting legacy. In the 2014 survey, Onassis and her first husband were also ranked the 6th-highest out of 39 first couples in terms of being a "power couple".

In the 1982 Siena Research Institute survey, Onassis had been ranked the lowest in the criteria of integrity. In subsequent iterations of the survey, historians' regard for her integrity markedly improved. The initial disapproving view of her integrity may have been due to sentiments towards her marriage to Aristotle Onassis. Historians' overall opinions towards Onassis as a whole appear to have become more favorable in the subsequent years as she, in her second widowhood, demonstrated her independence with her career in publishing.

== Honors and memorials ==
External videos
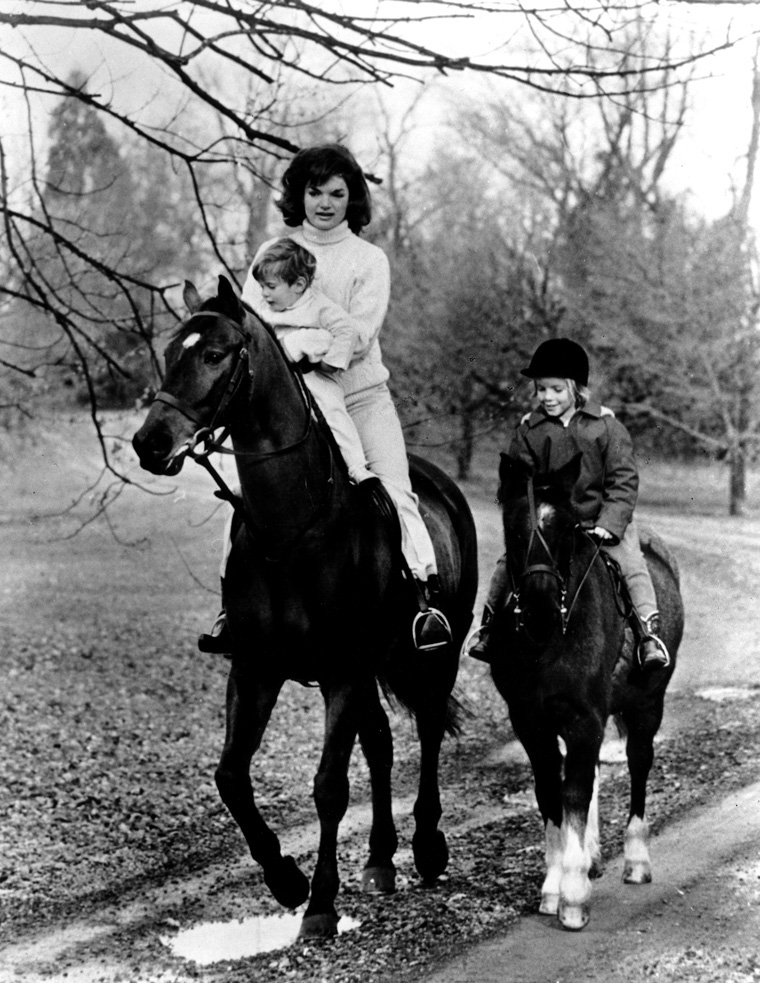
- Jacqueline Kennedy, First Ladies, Influence and Image, C-SPAN

- A high school named Jacqueline Kennedy Onassis High School for International Careers, was dedicated by New York City in 1995, the first high school named in her honor. It is located at 120 West 46th Street between Sixth and Seventh Avenues, and was formerly the High School of Performing Arts.
- Public School 66 in the Richmond Hill neighborhood of Queens, New York City, was renamed in honor of the former First Lady.
- The main reservoir in Central Park, located in Manhattan near her apartment, was renamed in her honor as the Jacqueline Kennedy Onassis Reservoir.
- The main entry foyer on East 42nd Street, across from Pershing Square, into Grand Central Terminal in New York City was renamed The Jacqueline Kennedy Onassis Foyer, in honor of her work in the 1970s of saving the terminal.
- The Municipal Art Society of New York presents the Jacqueline Kennedy Onassis Medal to an individual whose work and deeds have made an outstanding contribution to the city of New York. The medal was named in honor of the former MAS board member in 1994, for her tireless efforts to preserve and protect New York City's great architecture. She made her last public appearance at the Municipal Art Society two months before her May 1994 death.
- Jacqueline Bouvier Kennedy Onassis Hall at the George Washington University (her alma mater) in Washington, DC.
- The White House's East Garden was renamed the Jacqueline Kennedy Garden in her honor.
- In 2007, her name and her first husband's were included on the list of people aboard the Japanese Kaguya mission to the Moon launched on September 14, as part of the Planetary Society's "Wish Upon The Moon" campaign.
- A school and an award at the American Ballet Theatre have been named after her in honor of her childhood study of ballet.
- The companion book for a series of interviews between mythologist Joseph Campbell and Bill Moyers, The Power of Myth, was created under her direction prior to her death. The book's editor, Betty Sue Flowers, writes in the Editor's Note to The Power of Myth: "I am grateful ... to Jacqueline Lee Bouvier Kennedy Onassis, the Doubleday editor, whose interest in the books of Joseph Campbell was the prime mover in the publication of this book." A year after her death in 1994, Moyers dedicated the companion book for his PBS series, The Language of Life as follows: "To Jacqueline Kennedy Onassis. As you sail on to Ithaka." The reference is to the poem "Ithaka" by C. P. Cavafy that Maurice Tempelsman read at her funeral.
- In 2019, Time created 89 new covers to celebrate women of the year starting from 1920; it chose her for 1962.
- A white gazebo is dedicated to Jacqueline Kennedy Onassis on North Madison Street in Middleburg, Virginia. The First Lady and President Kennedy frequented the small town of Middleburg and intended to retire in the nearby town of Atoka. She also hunted with the Middleburg Hunt numerous times.

== Portrayals ==
Jaclyn Smith portrays Jacqueline Kennedy in the 1981 television film Jacqueline Bouvier Kennedy, depicting her life until the end of the JFK presidency. The film's producer Louis Rudolph stated an interest in creating a "positive portrait of a woman who I thought had been very much maligned," comments that were interpreted by John J. O'Connor of The New York Times as erasing any chances of critique toward her. Though Smith received praise for her performance, with Marilynn Preston of the Chicago Tribune calling her "convincing in an impossible role", Tom Shales of The Washington Post had a far less favorable opinion of her acting.

Blair Brown portrays Jacqueline Kennedy in the 1983 miniseries Kennedy, set during the Kennedy presidency. Brown used wigs and makeup to better resemble Kennedy and said through playing the role she gained a different view of the assassination: "I realized that this was a woman witnessing the public execution of her husband." Jason Bailey praised her performance, while Andrea Mullaney noted her resemblance to Kennedy and general shyness. Brown was nominated for a television BAFTA as Best Actress and a Golden Globe as Best Actress in a Miniseries or Television Film.

Marianna Bishop, Sarah Michelle Gellar, and Roma Downey portray Jacqueline Kennedy Onassis in the 1991 miniseries A Woman Named Jackie, covering her entire life until the death of Aristotle Onassis. Of being contacted for the role, Downey reflected: "I thought I was a strange choice because I didn't think I looked anything like her and I was Irish." Half of Downey's wardrobe was designed by Shelley Komarov and Downey stated that though she had long harbored "great respect and admiration" for Jacqueline Kennedy Onassis, she was unaware of the troubles in her childhood. Reviewer Rick Kogan praised Downey with doing "a surprisingly fine job in the demanding title role", while Howard Rosenberg lamented Downey's performance failing to "pierce this thick glaze of superficiality". Ability credited the role with raising Downey's profile. In 1992, the miniseries won the Emmy Award for Outstanding Miniseries.

Rhoda Griffis portrays Jacqueline Kennedy in the 1992 film Love Field, set shortly before and in the aftermath of JFK's assassination. It was Griffis's feature film debut. Griffis said she had been told by her orthodontist of her resemblance to Kennedy and was cast as her upon walking into the auditions for the role.

Sally Taylor-Isherwood, Emily VanCamp, and Joanne Whalley portray Jacqueline Kennedy Onassis in the 2000 television miniseries Jackie Bouvier Kennedy Onassis, covering chronologically her entire life. Whalley prepared for the role by listening to recordings of Jacqueline Kennedy Onassis's voice along with working with a dialect coach; by the end of production, she developed an attachment to her. Laura Fries assessed Whalley as lacking Jacqueline Kennedy Onassis's charisma despite being "soulful and regal" in her own right while Ron Wertheimer viewed Whalley as being passive in the role and lamented "the filmmakers render Jackie as Forrest Gump in a pillbox hat, someone who keeps passing close to the center of things without really touching – or being touched by – very much."

Stephanie Romanov portrays Jacqueline Kennedy in the 2000 film Thirteen Days, taking place during the Cuban Missile Crisis. Philip French of The Guardian noted her small role and being out of "the loop" was accurate of women's roles in "the early Sixties". Laura Clifford called Romanov "unconvincing" in the role.

Jill Hennessy portrays Jacqueline Kennedy in the 2001 television film Jackie, Ethel, Joan: The Women of Camelot. Hennessy prepared for the performance by watching hours of archival footage of Kennedy and cited one of the reasons for her favoring of the miniseries was its distinctiveness in not focusing "strictly on the men or only on Jackie". Reviewers Anita Gates and Terry Kelleher believed Hennessy brought "elegance" to the role while Steve Oxman panned the performance: "Hennessy simply doesn't possess the right natural grace. But this pic has a habit of telling us more that [sic] it shows us, and the actress manages to communicate the most important elements of the story without ever making it especially convincing."

Jacqueline Bisset portrays Jacqueline Kennedy in the 2003 film America's Prince: The John F. Kennedy Jr. Story. Bisset said the glasses she used during the film were holdovers from a prior role in The Greek Tycoon. Neil Genzlinger thought Bisset "should have known better" in taking on the role while Kristen Tauer wrote Bisset portraying Kennedy as a mother was a "different central light than many proceeding films".

Jeanne Tripplehorn portrays Jacqueline Kennedy in the 2009 film Grey Gardens for a single scene. Tripplehorn said questions she had about Edith Bouvier Beale that she thought would be answered by being a part of the film remained unresolved. Tripplehorn received diverse reactions to her performance while Brian Lowry noted her resemblance to Kennedy and small role.

Katie Holmes portrays Jacqueline Kennedy in the 2011 miniseries The Kennedys, set during the Kennedy presidency and its 2017 sequel The Kennedys: After Camelot, focusing on her life after 1968. Mary McNamara and Hank Stuever regarded Holmes's performance with neutrality in their reviews of The Kennedys while Hadley Freeman called her "bloodless" in the role. Holmes stated reprising the role was a "bigger challenge" for having to act through later periods of Kennedy's life. When asked of the concurrent Jackie film, Holmes said, "I think its [sic] really exciting. It's [sic] just is a testament to how amazing Jacqueline Kennedy Onassis was and how much she meant to our country." Holmes also stated both should be watched due to covering different periods of Jackie's life. In The Kennedys: After Camelot, Holmes's performance was viewed favorably by Daniel Feinberg and Allison Keane while Kristi Turnquist panned her.

Minka Kelly portrays Jacqueline Kennedy in the 2013 film The Butler, giving the film's protagonist Cecil one of her husband's neckties after his assassination. Kelly said she was intimidated and scared taking on the role. Kelly admitted to having difficulty with perfecting Kennedy's voice, going "to sleep listening to her", and having discomfort with the wool clothing associated with the role.

Ginnifer Goodwin portrays her in the 2013 television film Killing Kennedy. Goodwin used intimate photos to better portray Jacqueline Kennedy and was concerned "to do her justice and to play her as accurately as possible without ever doing an impression of her". Costar Rob Lowe said of seeing Goodwin in the pink Chanel suit, "It made it real. If I were under any illusions about what we were doing, seeing her in that iconic moment was, I would say, sobering." Tom Carson wrote that Goodwin's "trademark vulnerability humanizes Jackie considerably" while Bruce Miller called her a miscast and Robert Lloyd and Brian Lowry panned her performance.

Kim Allen portrays Jacqueline Kennedy in the 2016 film LBJ. Ray Bennett noted in his review of the film that Allen was in a non-speaking role.

Natalie Portman portrays Jacqueline Kennedy in the 2016 film Jackie, set during the JFK presidency and the immediate aftermath of the assassination. Portman admitted being intimidated taking the role and doing research in preparation for filming. Nigel M. Smith wrote that by portraying Kennedy, Portman was "taking on arguably the biggest challenge of her career". Manohla Dargis, David Edelstein, and Peter Bradshaw praised her performance. Portman was nominated for Best Actress by Academy Awards, AACTA Awards, AWFJ, AFCA, and BSFC, and won the category by the Online Film Critics Society.

Jodi Balfour portrays Jacqueline Kennedy in the 2017 eighth episode of the second season of Netflix's drama series, The Crown, titled "Dear Mrs. Kennedy", set during the June 1961 visit of the Kennedy couple to Buckingham Palace and the immediate reaction to the assassination of John F. Kennedy. Naomi Watts portrays Kennedy in the final years of her life in the 2026 television mini-series Love Story.

== See also ==
- Bibliography of United States presidential spouses and first ladies
- Bouvier family
- Kennedy family
- Kennedy curse

== Notes ==
Honorary titles
Preceded by Mamie Eisenhower	First Lady of the United States; 1961–1963	Succeeded by Lady Bird Johnson
