= Bouvier family =

American family

Bouvier Lee, Auchincloss
- Current region: New York
- Origin: France
- Founded: 1820; 206 years ago
- Founder: Michel Bouvier
- Members: John Vernou Bouvier Jr. John Vernou Bouvier III; Jacqueline Kennedy Onassis; Lee Radziwill
- Connected members: Janet Norton Lee; John F. Kennedy; Aristotle Onassis; Michael Temple Canfield; Stanisław Albrecht Radziwiłł; Francis Anthony Drexel
- Connected families: Kennedy family House of Radziwiłł; Vanderbilt family
- Estate: Lasata

The Bouvier family or Bouvier-Lee-Auchincloss family is the family of former First Lady of the United States Jacqueline Kennedy Onassis (née Bouvier); through her, the Bouviers are connected by marriage with the Kennedy family and the Onassis family. The Bouvier family immigrated to the United States in 1815 and joined the American upper class over subsequent years. Members of the family have French, Irish, and English ancestry.

== History ==
Michel Bouvier, a veteran of the Napoleonic Wars, was a French cabinet maker who immigrated to Philadelphia in 1815. By the time of his death, he had become wealthy, owning a cabinet-making business and large lands which contained coal reserves.

His sons John Vernou Bouvier Sr. and Michel "M.C". Bouvier worked on Wall Street, relocating to New York and further growing the family fortune. His daughter Emma Mary Bouvier (1833–1883), married financier Francis Anthony Drexel, the son of Francis Martin Drexel and the brother of Anthony Joseph Drexel who founded present-day J.P. Morgan & Co. and was influential in developing the private banking system of the United States.

John Vernou Bouvier Jr. was born in 1866 and inherited US$250,000 (equivalent to $4,687,500 in 2025) from the family, some of which he lost in the Wall Street crash of 1929. He was also a successful attorney.

John Vernou Bouvier III, the son of J. V. Bouvier Jr married Janet Norton Lee in 1928. Her father was James Thomas Lee, who came from another prominent Manhattan family. His father, Dr. James Lee, was the superintendent of New York Public Schools, as well as a local physician. Lee became a lawyer in the real estate industry, before investing in real estate successfully and developing several luxury buildings in Manhattan, including the Peter Stuyvesant Apartments.

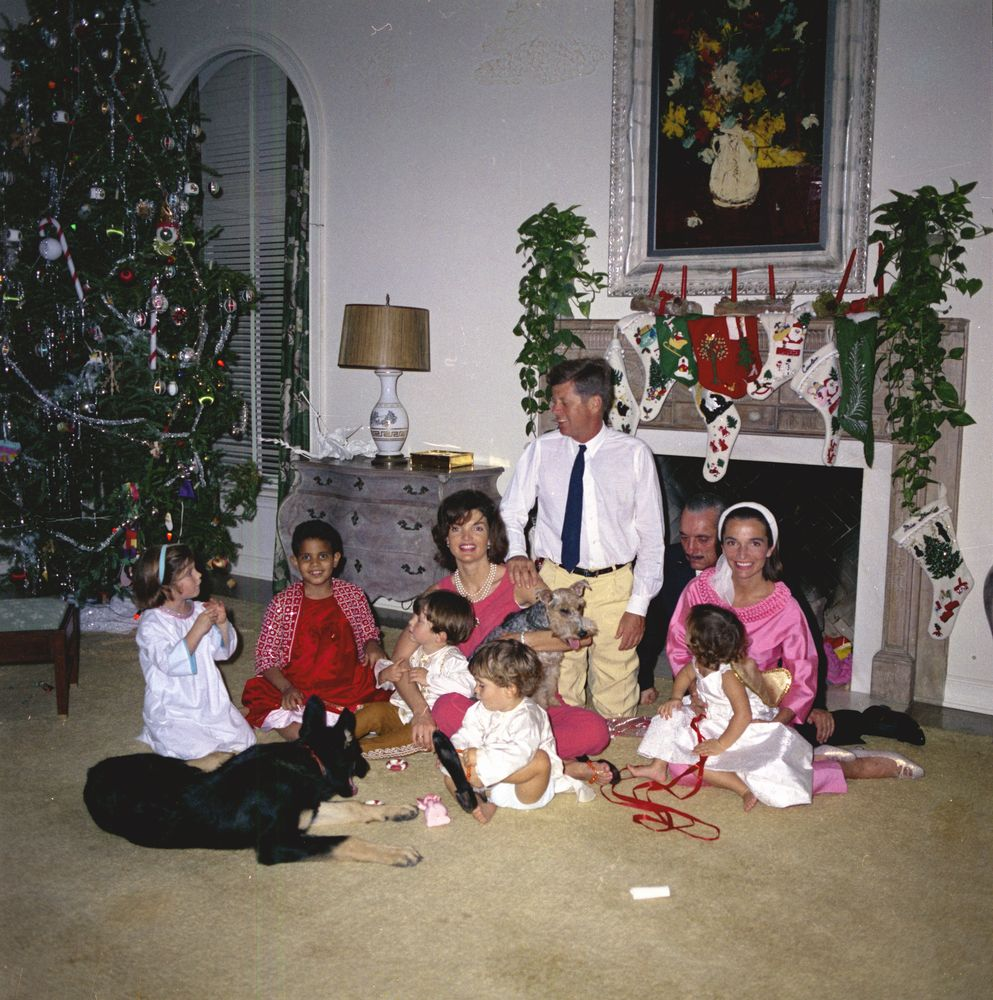
Bouvier sisters Jackie and Lee with President John F. Kennedy and other family. Palm Beach, Florida (1962)

John III and Janet had two daughters: Jacqueline, who married John F. Kennedy in 1953 and later Aristotle Onassis; and Lee, who married Michael Temple Canfield, Stanisław Albrecht Radziwiłł and Herbert Ross. Janet later married stockbroker and lawyer Hugh D. Auchincloss Jr., the son of Hugh D. Auchincloss Sr. and a stepfather of Gore Vidal. Their marriage produced Janet Auchincloss Rutherfurd, who married Lewis Polk Rutherfurd, grandson of Levi P. Morton, former Vice President of the United States.

John Vernou Bouvier Jr's daughter Edith Ewing Bouvier Beale married Phelan Beale. They had children: Bouvier Beale, Phelan Beale Jr. and Edith Bouvier Beale.

In 1975 Edith Ewing Bouvier Beale and her daughter "Little Edie" were the subjects of a documentary called Grey Gardens. It documented their day-to-day lives living in the dilapidated Grey Gardens mansion with raccoons and cats in increasing squalor.

They are most known for their connection with the Kennedy family.

== Residences ==
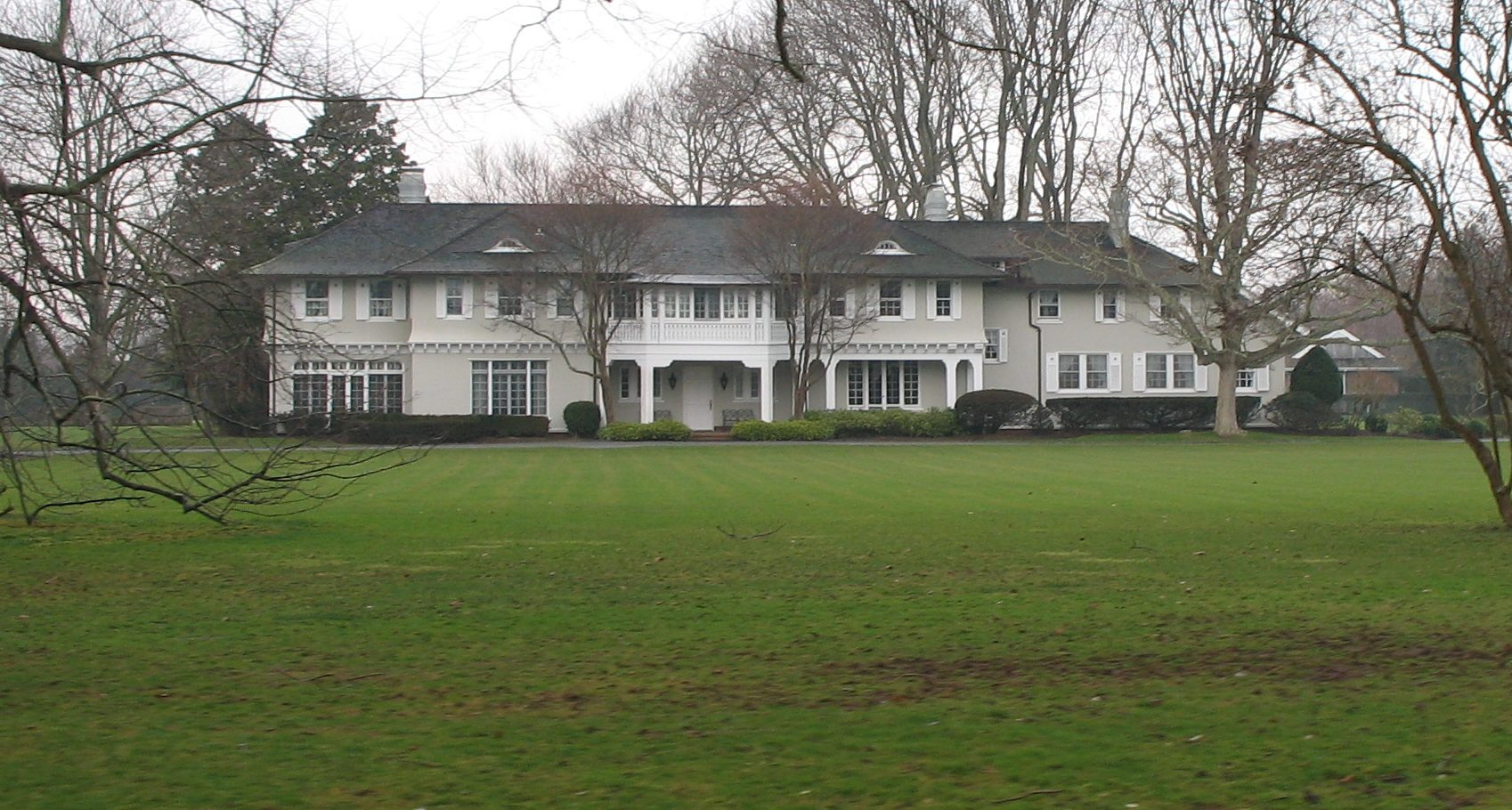
The Bouvier family home, Lasata

The residence most commonly associated with the family is Lasata, the home of John Vernou Bouvier Jr. in East Hampton, New York. John Jr's daughter, Edith Ewing Bouvier Beale purchased the Grey Gardens house in East Hampton and lived there with her daughter Edith Bouvier Beale into old age, failing to maintain the house as it became increasingly derelict. In 1975, a documentary film was made about the house and its occupants, the Bouvier Beales.
