= Phelan Beale Jr. =

American journalist (1920–1993)

- Born: June 16, 1920; New York City, U.S.
- Died: June 26, 1993 (aged 73); Oklahoma City, Oklahoma, U.S.
- Resting place: Forest Park Cemetery East, Houston, Texas
- Other name: Phe
- Education: Columbia University
- Occupations: Journalist, author, Oklahoma Employment Security Commission employee
- Spouse: Rosella Ramsey (after 1942)
- Children: 1
- Parent(s): Phelan Beale Sr. Edith Ewing Bouvier Beale
- Relatives: Edith Bouvier Beale (sister); Bouvier Beale (brother)

Phelan Beale Jr. (June 16, 1920 – June 26, 1993) was an American journalist and unemployment compensation law expert. He was a son of Edith Ewing Bouvier Beale and a brother of Edith Bouvier Beale whose lives were highlighted in the documentary Grey Gardens. He was a first cousin of former First Lady Jacqueline Kennedy and Princess Lee Radziwill.

== Early life ==
Beale was born on June 16, 1920, in New York City. He was the middle child of Phelan Beale Sr. and his wife Edith Ewing Bouvier Beale (known as "Big Edie"), the daughter of his father's law partner, John Vernou Bouvier Jr. His older sister was socialite Edith Bouvier Beale (nicknamed "Little Edie") and his younger brother was lawyer Bouvier Beale. Beale grew up at Grey Gardens at 3 West End Road in the wealthy Georgica Pond neighborhood in East Hampton on Long Island. Beale was known as "Phe" to his friends and family.

Beale was educated at the Westminster School for Boys in Simsbury, Connecticut. He then attended Columbia University, where he studied journalism, and was a member of the class of 1944.

== Career ==
During World War II, Beale was drafted into the United States Army in 1942 and was sent to Camp Gruber near Braggs, Oklahoma. He served in the Pacific Theater of Operations, participating in the battles of Saipan and Okinawa. Beale was wounded in action and received two bronze battle stars and a Purple Heart for his service.

=== Public service career ===
Beale was employed with the Oklahoma Employment Security Commission in Tulsa and Oklahoma City for 30 years. Following his retirement from the commission, he consulted on unemployment compensation law.

=== Writing career ===
Beale was well known as an accomplished speaker and writer. He delivered speeches to numerous organizations on a variety of subjects and wrote magazine and newspaper articles. Throughout his writing career, Beale won hundreds of writing contests. He later appeared in television commercials for MCI Communications.

== Personal life ==
Beale married Rosella Ramsey on December 26, 1942, in Tulsa, Oklahoma. He and Rosella met at a United Service Organizations dance in Tulsa in 1942 and eloped two weeks later. They had one daughter, Michelle Beale.

Beale was an American Kennel Club-licensed dog judge and toured the United States judging obedience trials. He enjoyed fishing in Galveston, Texas.

=== Grey Gardens ===
In 1971, Beale wrote "The Maysley Brothers — is that their name?," an article that appeared in The Capital Times of Madison, Wisconsin. In the article, he deplores the attention accorded his mother and sister at that time: "Such heartbreak and degradation…not the best publicity in the world for the family." He noted that he would see Grey Gardens "out of curiosity." Beale's younger brother Bouvier sent him the documentary's reviews, which Beale expressed made him decidedly unhappy about "those two people (who) made the movie." In the article, Beale reminisced about "the entertainment, the parties" at the Grey Gardens estate and his sister's coming out party at the Ritz-Carlton in New York City. He referred to all these activities as "all that Great Gatsby stuff." He wrote that his father refused his mother alimony and that there was a trust fund but that "trying to keep up that white elephant Grey Gardens is what ruined it."
