= Phelan Beale =

American lawyer

- Born: May 23, 1881; Chattanooga, Tennessee, U.S.
- Died: June 12, 1956 (aged 75); Pass Christian, Mississippi, U.S.
- Education: University of the South (1902); Columbia Law School (1905)
- Occupation: Lawyer
- Spouses: Edith Ewing Bouvier Beale (m. 1917; div. 1946) Dorothy D. Durham (m. 1947)
- Children: Edith Bouvier Beale; Phelan Beale, Jr. Bouvier Beale
- Relatives: John D. Phelan (grandfather)

Phelan Beale (May 23, 1881 – June 12, 1956) was an American attorney and sportsman in New York City who was married to Edith Ewing Bouvier, an aunt of former First Lady of the United States Jacqueline Kennedy Onassis. Beale is probably best remembered as the absent father chronicled in the Grey Gardens saga portrayed in a 1975 movie documentary, 2006 Broadway musical, and 2009 HBO film, all of which were named for his home in East Hampton, New York.

== Early life ==
Beale was born May 23, 1881 in Chattanooga, Tennessee, the second eldest of three children, to Jesse Drew Beale (1851-1905), a prominent Alabama judge, hailing from New Bern, North Carolina, and Caroline Blount "Carrie" Beale (née Phelan; 1856-1948).

He grew up in Montgomery, Alabama. He was the grandson of John D. Phelan (1809-1879), an Alabama Speaker of the House and Alabama Supreme Court Justice. Beale graduated from the University of the South in 1902 and from Columbia Law School in 1905.

== Career ==
He formed the law practice of Bouvier and Beale with Edith Ewing Beale's father John Vernou Bouvier Jr. He later served a two-year term as president of the New York Southern Society before he was succeeded by Supreme Court Justice William Harman Black in 1937.

=== Properties ===
In 1924, Beale and his wife acquired the 28-room Grey Gardens mansion fronting the ocean (the oceanfront parcels were sold much later) in the Georgica Pond neighborhood. Beale and his wife separated in 1931 and were legally divorced in 1946, but continued his presence in East Hampton. As part of the divorce, Edith was given the East Hampton house Grey Gardens.

He owned the Grey Goose Gun Club of Cedar Point, a hunting preserve at what is now Cedar Point County Park in East Hampton. In 1937, he expanded it by buying the abandoned Cedar Island Light on an island next to his property. For four years, he rented out the lighthouse property to Isabel and Winthrop Bradley of Connecticut as a summer retreat and then this couple bought the property in 1943.

Washed up sand during the New England Hurricane of 1938 joined the island to the land via an isthmus. The lodge is now the park foreman's residence just north of the park's general store.

== Personal life ==
On January 17, 1917, he married Bouvier's daughter Edith Ewing Bouvier (later nicknamed "Big Edie") at St. Patrick's Cathedral, New York City. Ushers at the wedding included Jacqueline Kennedy Onassis's father John Vernou Bouvier III and W. Sergeant Bouvier. They had three children:

- Edith Bouvier Beale (1917–2002), known as "Little Edie".
- Phelan Beale, Jr. (1920–1993), who married Rosella Ramsey in 1942.
- Bouvier Beale (1922–1994), who married Katharine Ridgely Jones in 1942.

In 1947, he remarried to Dorothy D. Durham of Poplarville, Mississippi. He died in Pass Christian, Mississippi in 1956. Big Edie died in 1977.
