= Bouvier Beale =

American lawyer

- Born: February 13, 1922; New York City, New York, U.S.
- Died: May 3, 1994 (aged 72); Glen Cove, New York, U.S.
- Other name: Buddy
- Education: Yale University
- Occupation: Lawyer
- Spouse: Katharine Ridgely Jones
- Children: 3
- Parent(s): Phelan Beale Sr. Edith Ewing Bouvier Beale
- Relatives: Edith Bouvier Beale (sister); Phelan Beale Jr. (brother)

Bouvier Beale (February 13, 1922 – May 3, 1994) was an American lawyer. Beale was one of the sons of Edith Ewing Bouvier Beale and was also a brother of Edith Bouvier Beale, whose lives were highlighted in the documentary Grey Gardens. Beale was a first cousin of former First Lady Jacqueline Kennedy and Princess Lee Radziwill.

== Early life and education ==
Beale was born on February 13, 1922, in New York City, New York. He was the youngest son of Phelan Beale Sr and his wife Edith Ewing Bouvier Beale (known as "Big Edie"), daughter of his father's law partner, John Vernou Bouvier Jr. Beale grew up at Grey Gardens at 3 West End Road in the wealthy Georgica Pond neighborhood in East Hampton on Long Island. Beale was known as "Buddy" to his friends and family. He attended Westminster School in Simsbury, Connecticut.

Unlike his sister and elder brother Phelan Beale Jr., Beale followed in the footsteps of his father and grandfather by attending Yale Law School and establishing his own law firm in New York—Walker and Beale (later Walker, Beale, Wainwright and Wolf).

== Personal life ==
Beale married Katharine Ridgely Jones, daughter of Mr. and Mrs. Nicholas Ridgely Jones of New York and Glen Cove, New York, at St. Johns Episcopal Church of Lattingtown in 1942. Beale's brother Phelan was his best man for the ceremony. Beale's ceremony was half over when his mother Big Edie arrived, dressed like an opera star.

Beale and Katharine had three sons:

- Bouvier Beale Jr.
- Nicholas Beale
- Christopher Prince Beale

Beale and his family resided in the historic 1906 Italian Renaissance-styled home Cedarcroft in Glen Cove on Long Island, and in 1971, built their summer home in Bridgehampton, New York. Beale spent his weekends and summers on Long Island at the Piping Rock Club, Jones Beach, and Bridgehampton.

Beale was raised a Catholic by his mother, but was an atheist and nihilist in his adulthood. It was Beale's belief that Karl Marx "had it right about religion."

Beale died on May 3, 1994, in Glen Cove. His funeral service was held at St. John's Episcopal Church of Lattingtown in Locust Valley on Long Island. His eulogy was given by his son Christopher Beale.

=== Grey Gardens ===
Despite a successful career in law, Beale was best known for playing an active role in trying to persuade his mother Big Edie and sister Little Edie to vacate and sell their Grey Gardens estate in East Hampton. He and his brother Phelan refused to pay for the home's utilities and upkeep in order to compel the women to leave the dilapidated mansion. After the Suffolk County Health Department raided the mansion on October 22, 1971, Sidney Beckwith of the health department contacted Beale to convey the report of his inspection. Beale responded, “Mr. Beckwith, you’ve described it very well, but it’s nothing new—Mother is the original hippie." After his first cousins Jacqueline Kennedy Onassis and Lee Radziwill came to the aid of Big Edie and Little Edie by having the mansion repaired and cleaned to meet health, sanitation, and building codes, Beale reluctantly paid the back property taxes on the estate.
