= Edith Beale =

Edith Beale may refer to:

- Edith Bouvier Beale (1917–2002), American socialite and fashion model
- Edith Ewing Bouvier Beale (1895–1977), her mother, American socialite and singer
