= Edith Ewing Bouvier Beale =

American socialite and singer (1895 – 1977)

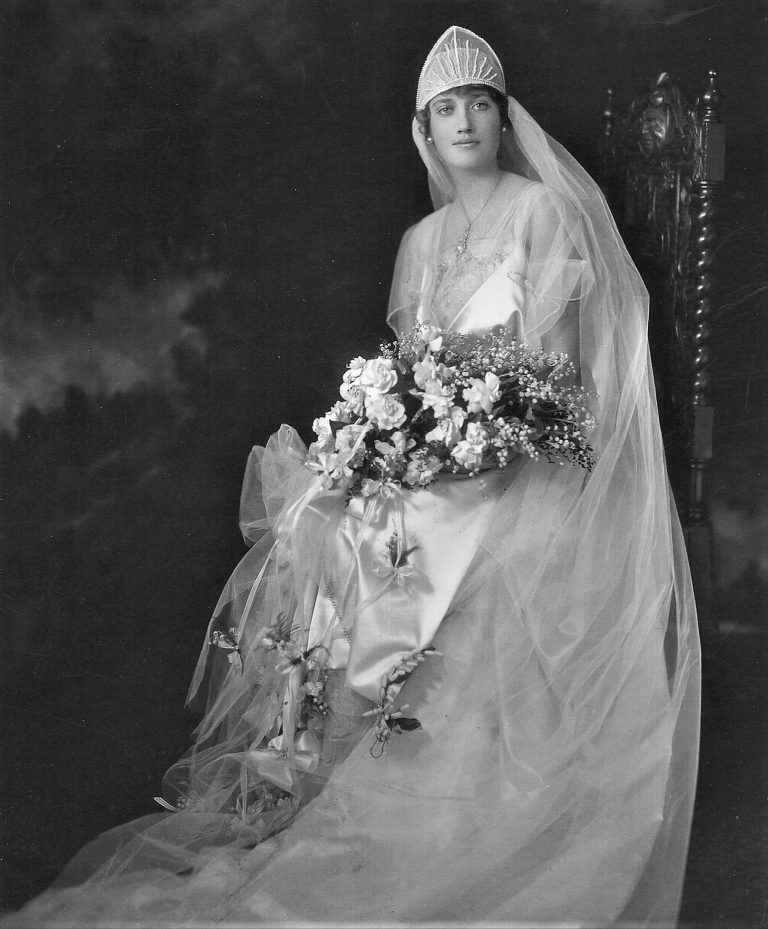
- Edith "Big Edie" Ewing Bouvier Beale 1917 Wedding Portrait
- Born: Edith Ewing Bouvier; October 5, 1895; Nutley, New Jersey, U.S.
- Died: February 5, 1977 (aged 81); Southampton, New York, U.S.
- Other name: Big Edie
- Spouse: Phelan Beale (m. 1917; div. 1946)
- Children: Edith Bouvier Beale; Phelan Beale, Jr. Bouvier Beale
- Parent(s): John Vernou Bouvier Jr. Maude Frances Sergeant Bouvier
- Family: Bouvier family

Edith Ewing Bouvier Beale (October 5, 1895 – February 5, 1977) was an American socialite and singer known for her reclusive and eccentric lifestyle. Known as Big Edie, she was a sister of John Vernou Bouvier III and an aunt of First Lady Jacqueline Kennedy Onassis and socialite Princess Lee Radziwill. Her life and relationship with her daughter Edith Bouvier Beale was highlighted in the 1975 documentary Grey Gardens.

== Biography ==
Beale's parents were Maude Frances Sergeant and John Vernou Bouvier Jr., the paternal grandparents of Jacqueline Bouvier Kennedy Onassis. Her siblings were John Vernou Bouvier III; William Sergeant "Bud" Bouvier (1893–1929), who died from alcoholism; and twin sisters Maude Reppelin Bouvier Davis (1905–1999) and Michelle Caroline Bouvier Scott Putnam (1905–1987).

Beale was engaged to Horace R. Bigelow Allen. However they broke off their engagement in 1916. Horace immediately joined the Red Cross and left for France to drive ambulances during World War I. There, he married another socialite named Kiki Gwynne. Kiki went on to become known as "the girl with the silver syringe" and was the alleged mother of a child born out of wedlock with Prince George, Duke of Kent, fourth son of King George V. That child, Michael Temple Canfield, became Beale's niece Lee Radziwill’s first husband.

Beale pursued an amateur singing career and in 1917 married lawyer/financier Phelan Beale (who worked at her father's law firm Bouvier and Beale) in a lavish Catholic ceremony at St. Patrick's Cathedral in New York. The couple lived at 987 Madison Avenue (now the site of the Carlyle Hotel). They had three children: daughter Edith (who was referred to as "Little Edie", 1917–2002) and two sons (Phelan Beale, Jr., 1920–1993, and Bouvier Beale, 1922–1994).

In 1923, Phelan Beale purchased the Grey Gardens mansion in the Georgica neighborhood of East Hampton, a block from the Atlantic Ocean. The Beales separated in 1931, with Edith retaining the Grey Gardens house. Edith received child support, but no form of alimony. She continued to pursue her singing career, giving recitals in her home and at local functions. Her sons went to college and World War II duty and had families of their own. In 1946, Phelan Beale notified her of their divorce via telegram from Mexico. In July 1952, Beale's daughter Edith (known as "Little Edie") returned after five years in Manhattan to live permanently at Grey Gardens.

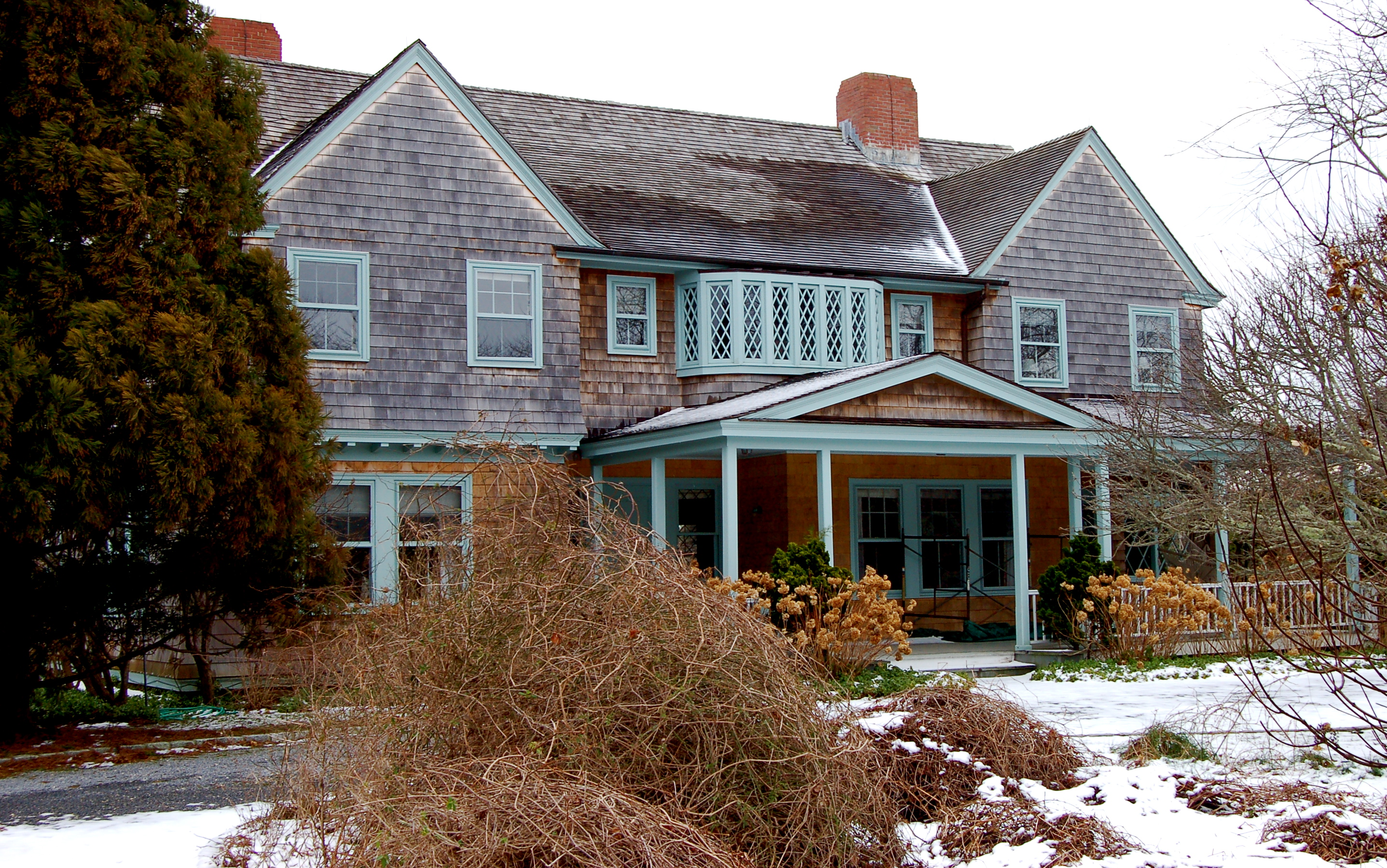
Grey Gardens in January 2009

In October 1971, police raided Grey Gardens and found the house "full of litter, rife with the odor of cats, and in violation of various local ordinances". The Suffolk County, New York, Board of Health prepared to evict Beale and "Little Edie" due to the unsafe condition of the property. Following the publicity, Beale's family paid a reported $30,000 to refurbish the property, settle back taxes, and give Beale and "Little Edie" a stipend (the two women's trust fund income had run out some years before). The eviction proceedings were dropped.

Beale's niece, Lee Radziwill, hired documentary filmmakers Albert and David Maysles in 1972 to work on a film about the Bouvier family. At the outset, the brothers filmed Beale and "Little Edie". The original film project was not completed, and Radziwill kept the footage that had been shot of the Beales.

The Maysles brothers were fascinated by the unique life the two women led. After raising funds for film and equipment on their own they returned and filmed 70 more hours of footage with Beale and "Little Edie". The resulting 1975 film Grey Gardens is widely considered a seminal masterpiece of the documentary genre.

Beale died of pneumonia at Southampton Hospital in Southampton, New York on February 5, 1977. She is buried in the Bouvier family plot at Most Holy Trinity Catholic Cemetery in East Hampton.

As Beale neared her death, "Little Edie" reportedly asked if she had any final thoughts. Beale replied: "There's nothing more to say. It's all in the film."

== Legacy ==
The notoriety of the 1975 Grey Gardens documentary prompted various other works. The documentary was adapted as a 2006 musical of the same name, including the characters Lee and Jackie Bouvier appearing as visiting children in retrospect. The documentary film and the story surrounding the Beales' lives was the basis of the 2009 HBO television movie Grey Gardens with Beale portrayed by Jessica Lange. The original 1972 footage featuring Radziwill visiting the Beales was released in 2017 as That Summer.
