= Grey Gardens (estate) =

House in East Hampton, New York

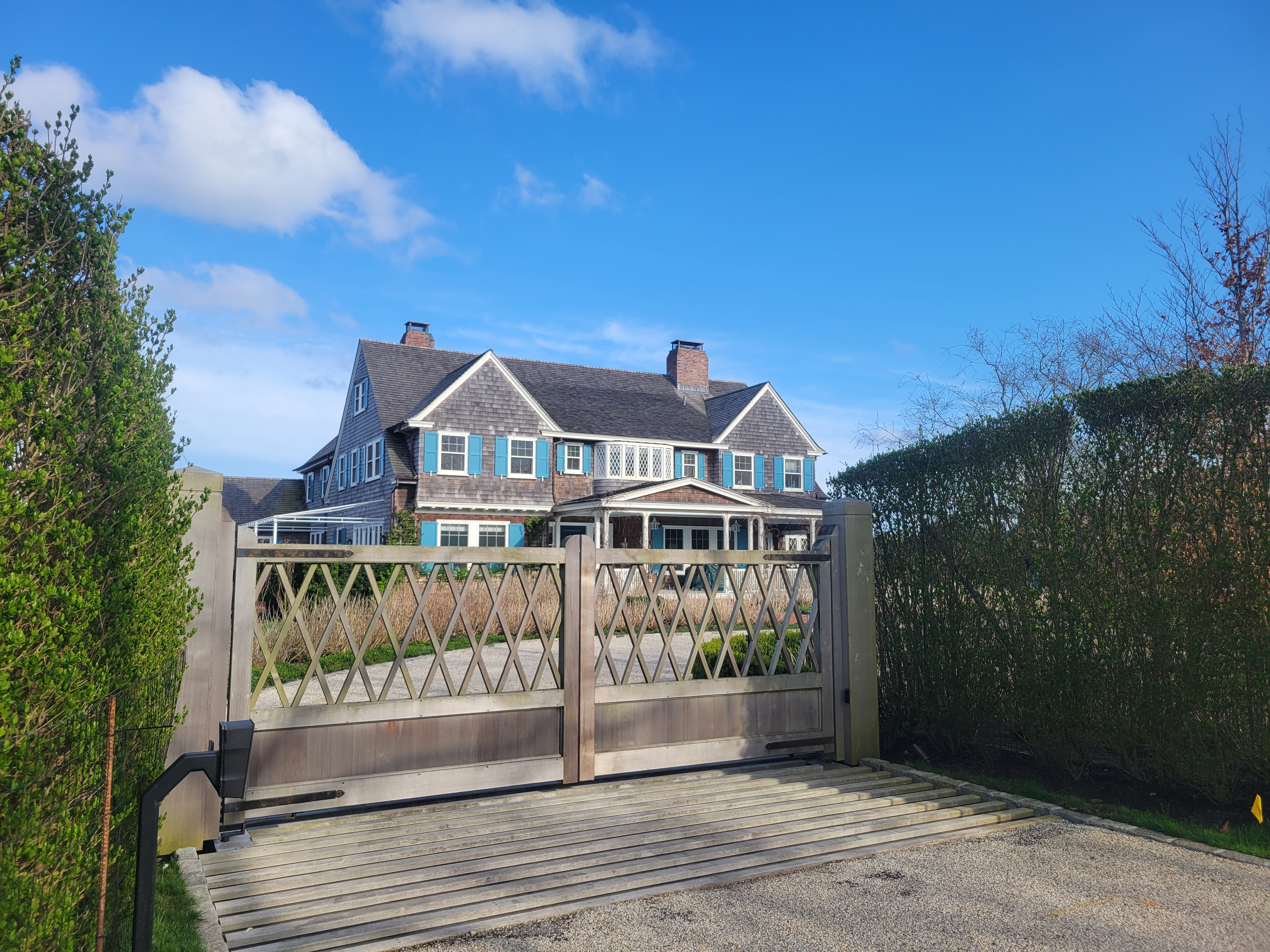
- Grey Gardens in 2023
- Interactive map of the Grey Gardens area

General information
- Architectural style: Shingle style
- Location: East Hampton, New York
- Coordinates: 40.9376°N 72.216144°W
- Completed: 1897; 129 years ago
- Owner: Liz Lange
- Governing body: Private

Design and construction
- Architect: Joseph Greenleaf Thorp

Grey Gardens is a 14-room house at 3 West End Road and Lily Pond Lane in the Georgica Pond neighborhood of East Hampton, New York. It was the residence of the Beale family from 1924 to 1979, including mother and daughter Edith Ewing Bouvier Beale and Edith "Little Edie" Bouvier Beale from 1952 to 1977. The 1975 documentary Grey Gardens depicted the two living in squalor in the mansion; the highly regarded film spawned a 2006 Broadway musical, a 2009 television movie, and other adaptations.

The house dates from 1897, and was designed by Joseph Greenleaf Thorp. Other owners included Ben Bradlee and Sally Quinn, who lived in the house from 1979 to 2014, and extensively restored it before moving in. As of 2017 it was owned by fashion designer and entrepreneur Liz Lange.

== Design and early ownership ==
In 1895, 4 acres (16,000 m^{2}) of oceanfront land was bought by F. Stanhope Phillips and Margaret Bagg Phillips, daughter of John S. Bagg, who had acquired the Detroit Free Press in 1836. The Phillipses paid $2,500 (equivalent to $97,000 in 2025) from the estate of a Mr. Candy. The couple announced their plans to build a $100,000 (equivalent to $3,870,000 in 2025) house on the property. However, the purchase hit a snag when it was revealed that in 1875 Mr. Candy had bequeathed the land to the U.S. government.

In 1897, Joseph Greenleaf Thorp (1862–1934) designed the house. Thorpe had designed several other houses in East Hampton. However, the house was not immediately built. Stanhope Phillips died in 1901, leaving behind an estate valued at $250,000 (equivalent to $9,675,000 in 2025). His brother challenged Margaret for control of the estate, saying she had used undue influence on him and that she had cremated him so that an autopsy could not be performed to confirm this. The court sided with Margaret. After the ownership issues were settled, construction on the house started.

In 1913, Robert C. Hill, president of Consolidation Coal Company, bought the house. Hill's wife Anna Gilman Hill (1875–1955) imported ornate concrete walls from Spain to enclose the garden and hired landscape designer Ruth Bramley to create what would become the core of Grey Gardens. Bramley was married at the time to architect Aymar Embury II and their offices were in the same building.

== Beale ownership ==
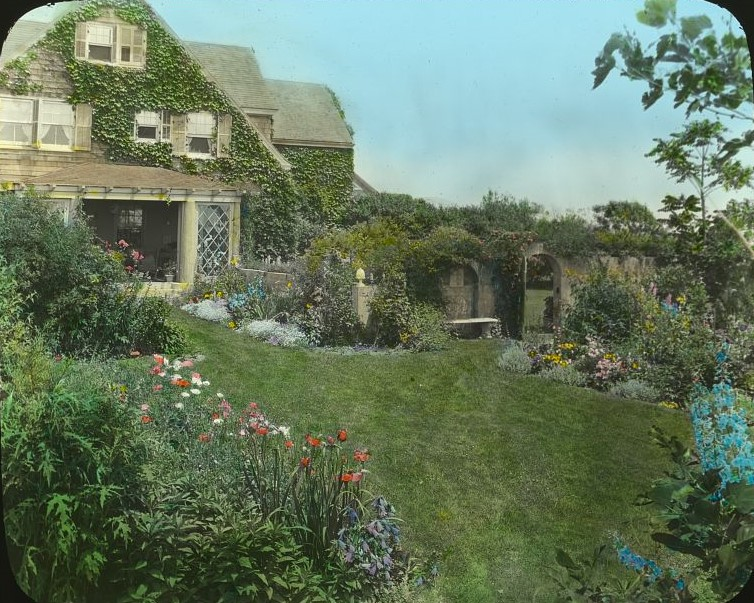
Grey Gardens, c.1916

In 1924, Phelan Beale acquired the estate for his wife Edith Ewing Bouvier Beale. Phelan was a law partner of John Vernou Bouvier Jr. and had married Bouvier's daughter, Edith. Bouvier owned an estate in East Hampton, located 3 mi (4.8 km) north on Further Lane at Lasata, where his granddaughter Jacqueline Bouvier Kennedy Onassis was a frequent visitor.

After an extended marital separation, Phelan Beale notified Edith of their divorce around 1946 by telegram from Mexico. Phelan provided Edith with an allowance of $300 (equivalent to $5,000 in 2025) per month to maintain the property, herself and her daughter Edith Bouvier Beale, who was commonly known as "Little" Edie. Phelan's financial support eventually ceased and the two Ediths lost contact with him. The house and garden fell into disrepair and were overtaken by nature due to the lack of funds. The two women continued to inhabit the house, where they kept a large number of cats and wild animals. Health Commission issued a notice of eviction, stating the Beales would be unable to live in the house until it was cleaned and basic utilities restored. The news of the order and of the squalor in which the two women lived received international attention because "Big" and "Little" Edie were the aunt and first cousin, respectively, of Jacqueline Kennedy — the widow of former US President John F. Kennedy, and wife of Aristotle Onassis.

Jacqueline and her sister, Lee Radziwill, donated money to make the house habitable and return it to a standard which would allow for the rescission of the eviction order.

That same year Radziwill asked brothers Albert and David Maysles to create a film, including interviews with the Edies, which would document the Bouvier family's visits to East Hampton during Lee's and Jacqueline's youth. The project was ultimately canceled and the Maysles turned their attention to the Beales, resulting in the 1975 documentary Grey Gardens. After the release of the film, Edith and Little Edie continued to reside in the house. Edith died in 1977 and Little Edie remained until she sold the property.

The original 1972 footage featuring Radziwill visiting the Beales was released in 2017 as That Summer.

== Post-Beale ownership ==
In 1979, Little Edie sold Grey Gardens to Ben Bradlee and Sally Quinn for $220,000 (equivalent to $976,000 in 2025) with the stipulation that they were not to tear down the house. Little Edie reportedly told the couple, "all it needs is a coat of paint!" Quinn later recalled that the dilapidated house "was worse than the movie," and was filled with waste from 52 feral cats. In his 1995 memoir, Bradlee wrote "In all my life, including years reporting about slums from Washington to Casablanca, I have never seen a house in such dreadful condition: attics full of raccoons and their droppings, toilets stopped up, a kitchen stove that had fallen into the cellar, a living room with literally half a floor... ...Whole rooms had been abandoned when they filled up with garbage, as the Beales moved to the next room."

Bradlee and Quinn restored the home, which would be featured in several architectural and home décor magazines. In February 2017, a widowed Quinn put the house up for sale with an asking price of $19,995,000. The Beale-owned furniture, along with household items owned by Quinn, were auctioned off in an estate sale held from November 17–19, 2017. On December 20, 2017, the house sold for $15.5 million to American fashion designer Liz Lange. Lange has since overseen a complete restoration of the home and its surrounding gardens by decorator Mark D. Sikes.

== Gallery ==
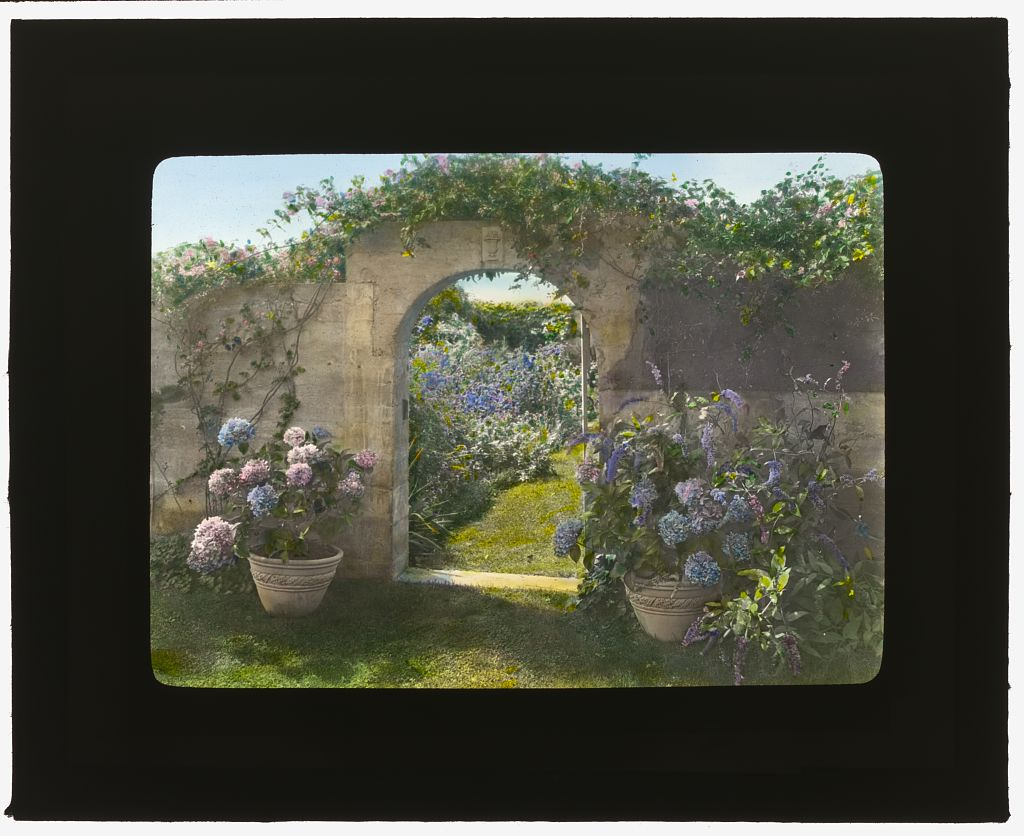
Northeast gate to garden c. 1916

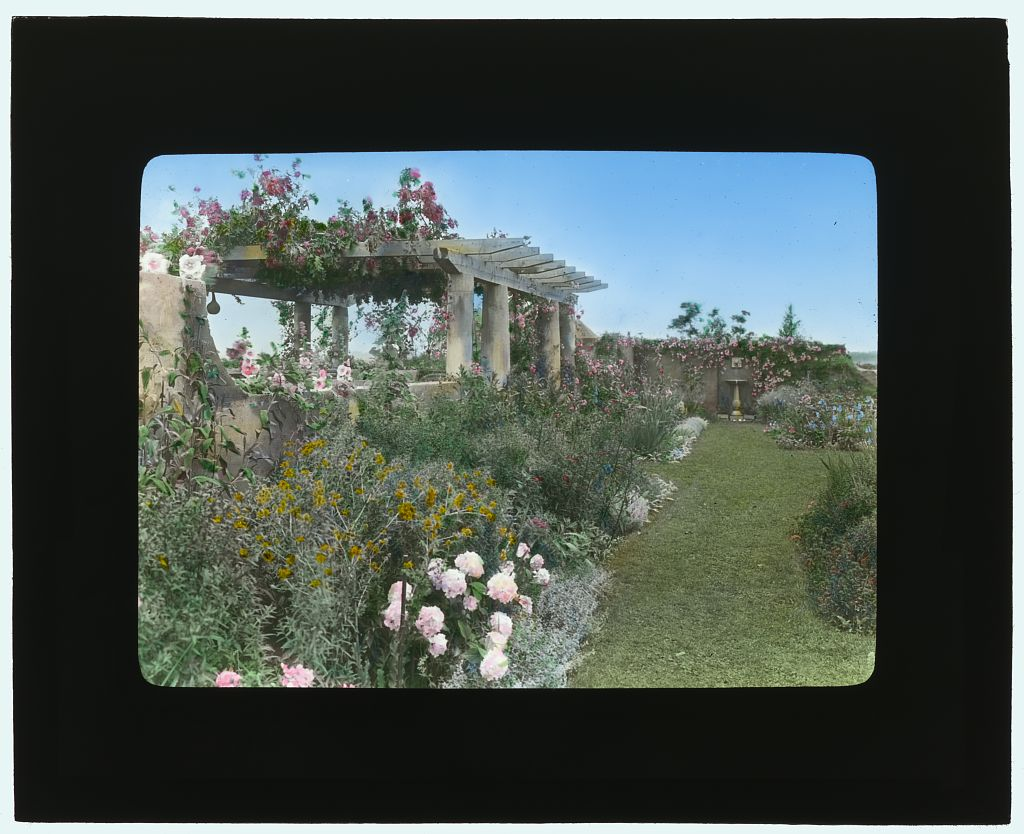
View west to pergola c. 1914

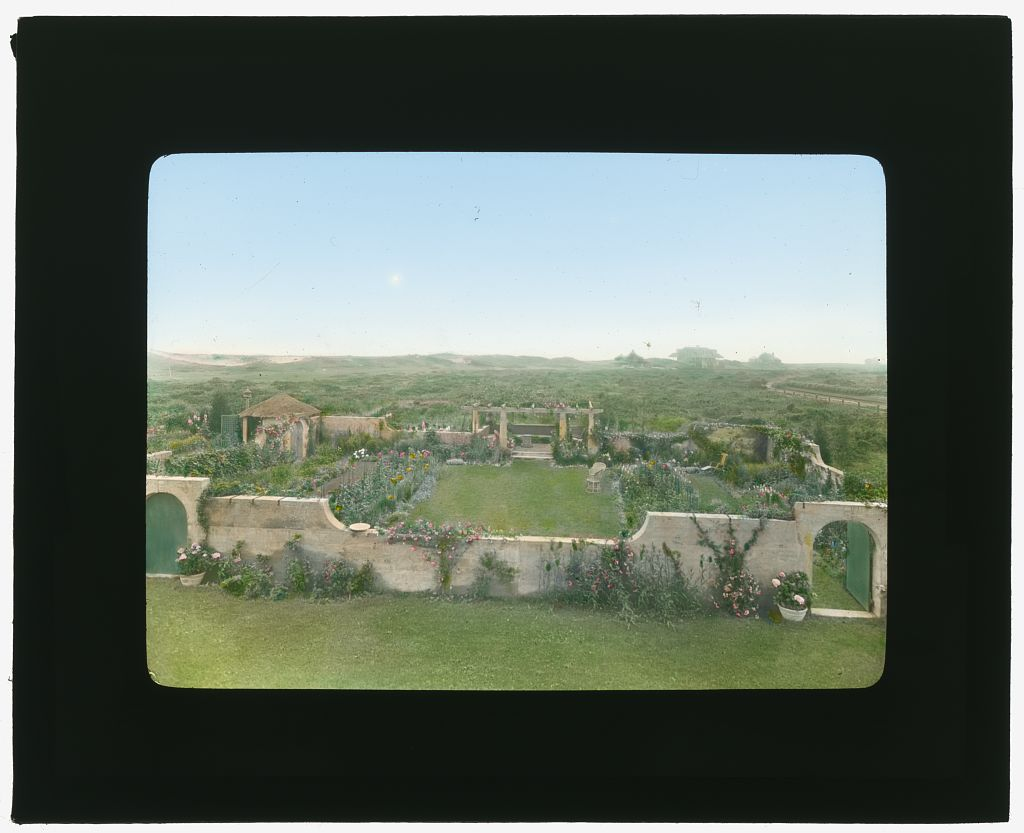
View from house c. 1914

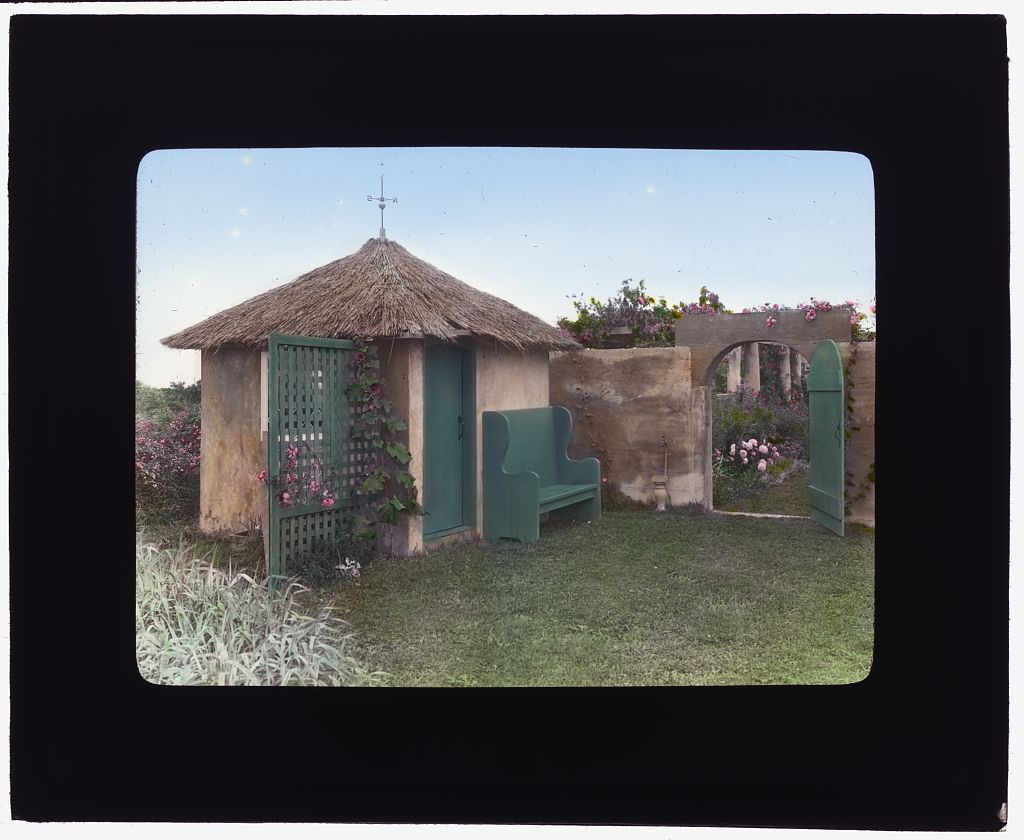
Garden tool house c. 1914

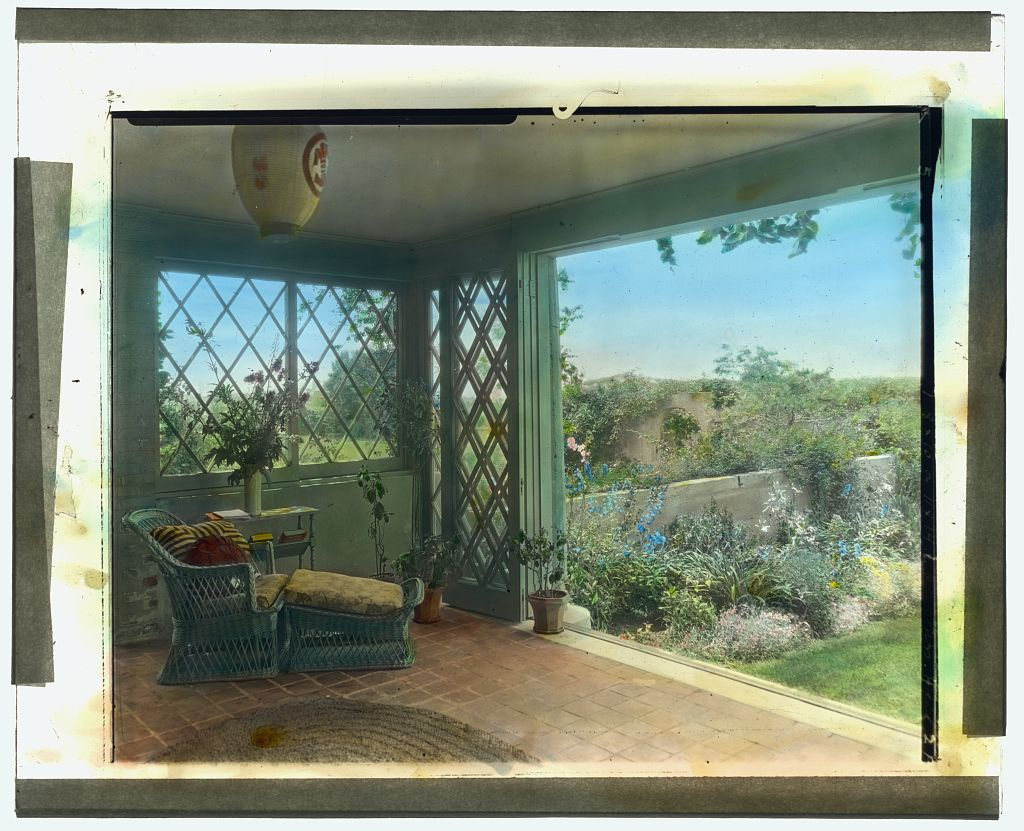
Sun-room overlooking walled garden c. 1916

Plan c. 1914
