= Grey Gardens (musical) =

2006 musical

- Cover of Broadway original cast recording of Grey Gardens
- Music: Scott Frankel
- Lyrics: Michael Korie
- Book: Doug Wright
- Basis: Grey Gardens; by Albert and David Maysles; Ellen Hovde; Muffie Meyer
- Productions: 2006 Off-Broadway; 2006 Broadway; 2011 Melbourne; 2013 Seattle; 2016 London; 2016 Toronto; 2016 Los Angeles

Grey Gardens is a musical with book by Doug Wright, music by Scott Frankel, and lyrics by Michael Korie, produced in 2006 and based on the 1975 documentary of the same title about the lives of Edith Ewing Bouvier Beale ("Big Edie") and her daughter Edith Bouvier Beale ("Little Edie") by Albert and David Maysles. The Beales were Jacqueline Kennedy's aunt and cousin, respectively. Set at Grey Gardens, the Bouviers' mansion in East Hampton, New York, the musical tracks the progression of the two women's lives from their original status as rich and socially polished aristocrats to their eventual largely isolated existence in a home overrun by cats and cited for repeated health code violations. However, its more central purpose is to untangle the complicated dynamics of their dysfunctional mother/daughter relationship.

== Storyline ==
The first act depicts the characters in their heyday and is a speculative take on what their lives might have been like when they were younger, when Little Edie was 24 and Big Edie 47. The second act is set 32 years later in 1973 at the decaying Grey Gardens estate and hews closely to the Maysles Brothers' documentary in its portrayal of them in their later years, when Little Edie is 56 and Big Edie is 79. While the first act is almost entirely fictional (the central event, the engagement between Little Edie and Joe Kennedy, Jr., never happened), the second act takes much of its dialogue and action directly from the film. The same actress who plays Big Edie in the first act plays Little Edie in the second act.

== Productions ==
The musical opened Off-Broadway at Playwrights Horizons on February 10, 2006, and ran through April 30, 2006. Directed by Michael Greif with choreography by Jeff Calhoun, it starred Christine Ebersole, Mary Louise Wilson, and John McMartin. It received mixed reviews, but attracted particularly good reviews for Ebersole and Wilson. It earned five Lucille Lortel Award nominations and twelve Drama Desk Award nominations.

Christine Ebersole received the Obie Award, Drama Desk Award, Outer Critics Circle Award, a special citation from the New York Drama Critics' Circle, and the Drama League Award for Performance of the Year (2006) for her dual roles of Edith and Edie Beale in the off-Broadway production.

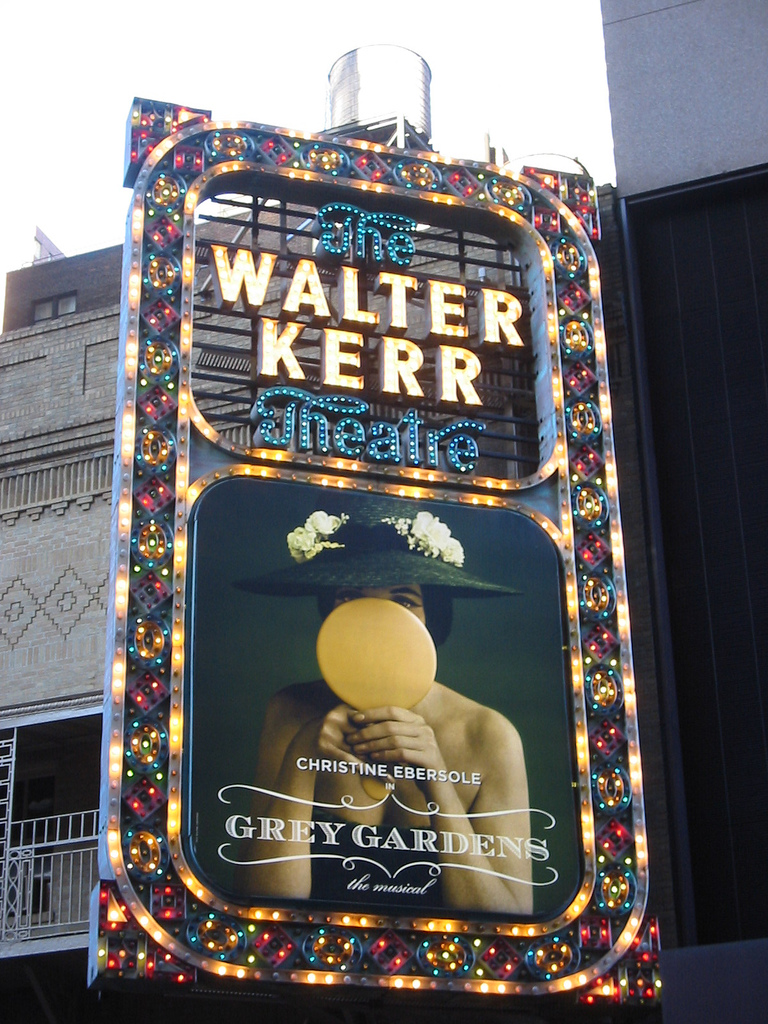
Marquee for the original Broadway production at The Walter Kerr Theatre in 2006

The show opened, with revisions, on Broadway on November 2, 2006, at the Walter Kerr Theatre and closed on July 29, 2007, after 307 performances and 33 previews. The production was nominated for 10 Tony Awards in 2007, winning three, including awards for both Ebersole and Wilson in leading and featured actress categories, respectively.

According to an article in Playbill on November 21, 2007, composer Scott Frankel said there were no plans for a national tour based on the 2006-07 Broadway production, but "Dramatists Play Service, Inc. is handling the show's licensing to stock, amateur, university and resident theatres. Independent productions, which started playing in those markets in 2008."

In the spring of 2013, a three-month run was mounted in Seattle as a co-production between the 5th Avenue Theatre and ACT Theatre, starring Patti Cohenour and Suzy Hunt.

In August 2015, a three-week production was held at the Bay Street Theater, Sag Harbor, New York. Directed by Michael Wilson, the cast featured Betty Buckley, Rachel York, Matt Doyle (Joe/Jerry), Simon Jones (Major/Peale), Howard McGillin (George Gould Strong), James Harkness (Brooks Sr./Brooks Jr.), Sarah Hunt (Young Edie), Gracie Beardsley (Lee), and Dakota Quackenbush. Buckley and York starred in a production at the Ahmanson Theatre, Los Angeles, California, again directed by Michael Wilson in July and August 2016.

=== International productions ===
The Australian premiere was a limited run from November 25 to December 4, 2011, presented by The Production Company at the Arts Centre Melbourne Playhouse. Directed by Roger Hodgman, the cast featured Pamela Rabe and Nancye Hayes. The Australian production was nominated for the Helpmann Award for Best Musical in 2012.

The Canadian premiere was presented from May 2 to 19, 2012, by Fighting Chance Productions in Vancouver, BC at the Jericho Arts Centre. The cast featured Cathy Wilmot (Big Edie - Act One/Little Edie - Act Two), Lucas Blaney (Joe Kennedy), Ranae Miller (Little Edie - Act One), Sue Sparlin (Big Edie - Act Two), Jack Rigg (Major Bouvier), Carman J. Price (Gould), Hal Rogers (Brooks), Angela Cotton (Jackie Bouvier) and Emma Cawood (Lee Bouvier) with direction and musical staging by Ryan Mooney and music direction by Caitlin Hayes.

A Japanese production opened on November 7, 2009, at Theater Creation in Tokyo and closed on December 6. The production then toured other Japanese cities, including Osaka and Nagoya.

A Brazilian production opened on March 15, 2013, at the Sala Municipal Baden Powell in Copacabana, Rio de Janeiro, performing 32 times and closing on May 5, 2013. With musical translations, adaptations, and production by Jonas Klabin with additional musical translations by Claudio Botelho, directed by Wolf Maya, musical direction Carlos Bauzys and Daniel Rocha. Starring Soraya Ravenle, Suely Franco, Carol, Puntel, Guilherme Terra, Sandro Christopher, Pierre Baitelli, Jorge Maya, Danilo Timm, Raquel Bonfante and Sofia Viamonte, with Mirna Rubim substituting Suely Franco during the last couple weeks. There were approximately 9000 spectators.

The Brazilian production was nominated:

- 3x to Cesgranrio Award (best light design for Luiz Paulo Nenen, best set design for Bia Junqueira, best actress for Suely Franco).
- 3x to APTR Award (best set design for Bia Junqueira, best supporting actress for Suely Franco, best production by popular vote Jonas Klabin (Oz).
- 1x to Shell Award (best actress for Suely Franco).

The production's set design was also selected for exhibit at the Prague Quadrennial 2015, Bia Junqueira was one of the set designer selected to represent Brazil.

London

The musical had its UK premiere at the Southwark Playhouse in January 2016. Directed by Thom Southerland, the cast included Sheila Hancock and Jenna Russell.

=== Documentary ===
A documentary from Independent Lens, Grey Gardens: From East Hampton to Broadway, about the making of the musical, was screened on October 18, 2007, at the Hamptons International Film Festival Long Island, and was later shown on television on PBS stations.

== Cast ==
Character	Off Broadway (2006)	Broadway (2006)	London (2016)	Los Angeles (2016)
Prologue (1973)
"Big" Edie Beale	Mary Louise Wilson	Mary Louise Wilson	Sheila Hancock	Betty Buckley
"Little" Edie Beale	Christine Ebersole	Christine Ebersole	Jenna Russell	Rachel York
Act 1 (1941)
"Big" Edie Beale	Christine Ebersole	Christine Ebersole	Jenna Russell	Rachel York
George Gould Strong	Bob Stillman	Bob Stillman	Jeremy Legat	Bryan Batt
Brooks, Sr.	Michael Potts	Michael Potts	Ako Mitchell	Davon Williams
Jacqueline Bouvier	Sarah Hyland	Sarah Hyland	Grace Jenkins, Eleanor Waldron	Katie Silverman
Lee Bouvier	Audrey Twitchell	Kelsey Fowler	Alana Hinge, Rebecca Nardin	Peyton Ella
"Little" Edie Beale	Sara Gettelfinger	Erin Davie	Rachel Anne Rayham	Sarah Hunt
Joseph P. Kennedy Jr.	Matt Cavenaugh	Matt Cavenaugh	Aaron Sidwell	Josh Young
J.V. "Major" Bouvier	John McMartin	John McMartin	Billy Boyle	Simon Jones
Act 2 (1973)
"Big" Edie Beale	Mary Louise Wilson	Mary Louise Wilson	Sheila Hancock	Betty Buckley
"Little" Edie Beale	Christine Ebersole	Christine Ebersole	Jenna Russell	Rachel York
Brooks Jr.	Michael Potts	Michael Potts	Ako Mitchell	Davon Williams
Jerry	Matt Cavenaugh	Matt Cavenaugh	Aaron Sidwell	Josh Young
Norman Vincent Peale	John McMartin	John McMartin	Billy Boyle	Simon Jones

== Song list ==
=== Act I ===
- "The Girl Who Has Everything" ≈ — Recording of Edith's voice
- "The Five-Fifteen" — Edith, Gould, Brooks, Jackie and Lee
- "Mother Darling" — Edie, Edith, and Gould
- "Goin' Places" ≈ — Joe and Edie
- "Marry Well" ≈ — Major Bouvier, Brooks, Jackie, Lee and Edie
- "Hominy Grits" — Edith, Gould, Jackie and Lee
- "Peas in a Pod" — Edie and Edith
- "Drift Away" — Gould and Edith
- "The Five-Fifteen" (Reprise) — Edith
- "Daddy's Girl" — Edie and Joe
- "The Telegram" — Edie
- "Will You?" — Edith

=== Act II ===
- "The Revolutionary Costume for Today" — Edie
- "The Cake I Had" — Edith
- "Entering Grey Gardens" — Ensemble
- "The House We Live In" — Edie and Ensemble
- "Jerry Likes My Corn" — Edith
- "Around the World" — Edie
- "Choose to Be Happy" — Norman Vincent Peale and Ensemble
- "Around the World" (Reprise) — Edie
- "Another Winter in a Summer Town" — Edie and Edith
- "The Girl Who Has Everything" (Reprise) — Recording of Edith's voice

≈ denotes new songs written for the Broadway production.

Songs omitted in the Broadway production: "Toyland", "Body Beautiful Beale", "Being Bouvier", "Better Fall Out of Love", "Tomorrow's Woman", "Peas in a Pod" (Reprise).

== Reception ==
The Broadway production was received enthusiastically by critics. Time magazine named Grey Gardens the best show of 2006. In reviewing the off-Broadway production, Ben Brantley, reviewing for The New York Times, wrote "A blend of gentle compassion and acute observation, Ms. Ebersole's performance is one of the most gorgeous ever to grace a musical." However, he also noted that the musical "tilts perilously toward cheap celebrity camp", with a "very long and finally tedious first act". Stephen Holden of The New York Times wrote that the musical "bring[s] to mind two phrases seldom linked nowadays: 'Broadway musical' and 'artistic integrity.' The songs from 'Grey Gardens,' with music by Scott Frankel and lyrics by Michael Korie, sustain a level of refined language and psychological detail as elevated as Stephen Sondheim's. The score is a meticulously fashioned piece of musical theater that gains in depth the more you listen to it."

== Recordings ==
The Off-Broadway cast album was released on August 22, 2006.

The Original Broadway Cast album was released on March 27, 2007, through PS Classics. It was nominated for a 2008 Grammy Award for Best Musical Show Album.

== Awards and nominations ==
=== Original off-Broadway production ===
Year	Award ceremony	Category	Nominee	Result
2006	Drama Desk Award	Outstanding Musical		Nominated
2006	Drama Desk Award	Outstanding Book of a Musical	Doug Wright	Nominated
2006	Drama Desk Award	Outstanding Actress in a Musical	Christine Ebersole	Won
2006	Drama Desk Award	Outstanding Featured Actor in a Musical	John McMartin	Nominated
2006	Drama Desk Award	Outstanding Featured Actress in a Musical	Mary Louise Wilson	Nominated
2006	Drama Desk Award	Outstanding Director of a Musical	Michael Greif	Nominated
2006	Drama Desk Award	Outstanding Music	Scott Frankel	Nominated
2006	Drama Desk Award	Outstanding Lyrics	Michael Korie	Nominated
2006	Drama Desk Award	Outstanding Orchestrations	Bruce Coughlin	Nominated
2006	Drama Desk Award	Outstanding Scenic Design of a Musical	Allen Moyer	Nominated
2006	Drama Desk Award	Outstanding Costume Design of a Musical	William Ivey Long	Nominated
2006	Drama Desk Award	Outstanding Sound Design in a Musical	Brian Ronan	Nominated
2006	New York Drama Critics' Circle Award	Special Citation	Christine Ebersole	Honored

=== Original Broadway production ===
Year	Award Ceremony	Category	Nominee	Result
2007	Tony Award	Best Musical		Nominated
2007	Tony Award	Best Book of a Musical	Doug Wright	Nominated
2007	Tony Award	Best Original Score	Scott Frankel & Michael Korie	Nominated
2007	Tony Award	Best Performance by a Leading Actress in a Musical	Christine Ebersole	Won
2007	Tony Award	Best Performance by a Featured Actress in a Musical	Mary Louise Wilson	Won
2007	Tony Award	Best Direction of a Musical	Michael Greif	Nominated
2007	Tony Award	Best Orchestrations	Bruce Coughlin	Nominated
2007	Tony Award	Best Scenic Design in a Musical	Allen Moyer	Nominated
2007	Tony Award	Best Costume Design in a Musical	William Ivey Long	Won
2007	Tony Award	Best Lighting Design in a Musical	Peter Kaczorowski	Nominated
2008	Grammy Award	Best Musical Show Album		Nominated
