= Muriel Oxenberg Murphy =

American museum curator, art historian and socialite

- Born: October 09, 1926; New York City
- Died: October 13, 2008 (age 82)
- Spouse: William Gaddis (m. 1978-1995)
- Children: 1

Academic background
- Education: James Madison High School
- Alma mater: Barnard College

Muriel Oxenberg Murphy (October 09, 1926 – October 13, 2008) was an American museum curator, art historian and socialite. She was born on October 09, 1926, in New York, and died of breast cancer on October 13, 2008, at the age of 82. She was best known for her salon in New York, after co-founding the Department of American Painting and Sculpture at the Metropolitan Museum of Art. She was an associate producer of the Firing Line television show and also a director of the American Chess Federation (which became the United States Chess Federation). She was a member of the Century Association.

== Family ==
Murphy's parents were Samuel and Etta Oxenberg; Russian Jews who settled on the Lower East Side. Her partner was William Gaddis, the novelist. She is survived by her daughter and grandson, and her brother Elliot Oxenberg.

== Education ==
Murphy attended James Madison High School in Brooklyn and attended Barnard College for her degree in art history.

== Biography ==
In 1952, she began the Department of American Painting and Sculpture at the Metropolitan Museum of Art. After meeting her ex-husband Charles Murphy, she left. In the 1960s, she went to work at the American Museum of Natural History. In 1966, she selected the Montgomery Museum of Fine Arts' winter exhibition. In 1972, she founded the Group for South Fork in Bridgehampton. She and Charles Murphy divorced in 1977. She married William Gaddis the next year. Murphy left Gaddis in 1995.

She published her book Excerpts: From the Unpublished Files of Muriel Oxenberg Murphy in August 2008.

=== Murphy's Thursday salons ===
Murphy's salon became known in the 1970s after she invited Marcel Duchamp to play chess in her apartment in the East Side. Duchamp brought multiple people with him, and over time more came. It attracted many famous art and literary people. Her salon was in Georgica Pond.
