= John Vernou Bouvier Jr. =

American lawyer (1866–1948)

Major John Vernou Bouvier Jr.
- Born: August 12, 1866; Philadelphia, Pennsylvania, U.S.
- Died: January 15, 1948 (aged 81); New York City, U.S.
- Resting place: Most Holy Trinity Catholic Cemetery
- Education: Columbia University; Columbia University School of Political Science; Columbia Law School
- Occupations: Lawyer, banker
- Spouse: Maude Frances Sergeant (m. 1890; died 1940)
- Children: 5, including John, Edith
- Relatives: Bouvier family

John Vernou Bouvier Jr. (August 12, 1866 – January 15, 1948) was an American Wall Street lawyer and stockbroker who was a patriarch of the Bouvier family. He was the father of John Vernou Bouvier III as well as the paternal grandfather of First Lady Jacqueline Kennedy Onassis, her younger sister Princess Lee Radziwill and the maternal grandfather of Edith Bouvier Beale.

== Early life ==
Bouvier was born on August 12, 1866, in Torresdale, Philadelphia, Pennsylvania. He was the son of Captain John Vernou Bouvier (1843–1926) and Caroline Maslin (née Ewing) Bouvier (1844–1929). His father was a U.S. Civil War veteran who served as aide-de-camp on the staff of General Marsena R. Patrick and was one of the earliest members of the New York Stock Exchange.

Bouvier's grandparents were Louise Clifford (née Vernou) Bouvier (1811–1872), of Philadelphia, the second wife of Michel Charles Bouvier (1792–1874), a French cabinetmaker from Pont-Saint-Esprit in southern France who immigrated to Philadelphia in 1815 after having served in the Napoleonic Wars. In addition to crafting fine furniture, Bouvier had a business distributing firewood which led to his acquisition of nearly 800,000 acres of forest, some of which turned out to contain large reserves of coal. Michel further grew his fortune in real estate speculation. John's father and uncles, Eustes and Michel Charles Bouvier Jr., distinguished themselves in the world of finance on Wall Street. As the only remaining male Bouvier heir, John Jr. inherited the Bouvier fortune from his father and uncles.

His early education was from private tutors in the United States and in France, then he attended the Columbia Grammar & Preparatory School in New York City. He graduated with an A.B. degree from Columbia University in 1886 as the president of his class. At Columbia he became a member of the Gamma Beta chapter of Delta Kappa Epsilon fraternity.

The following year, he received an A.M. degree from the Columbia Graduate School of Arts and Sciences, followed by an LL.B. degree from the Columbia Law School in 1889.

== Career ==
On June 28, 1888, Bouvier was admitted to the bar in New York and began working with the Hoadley, Lauterbach & Johnson firm. During World War I, he was commissioned a major in the Judge Advocate General's Department of the Army, the legal arm of the United States Army. After the war, he resumed the practice of law, with various firms, including Bouvier & Beale at 165 Broadway with his son-in-law Phelan Beale, until his retirement in 1930. Bouvier, who also held a seat on the Exchange, kept a diary and wrote on October 29, 1929, also known as "Black Tuesday" of the 1929 crash, "XXXX Blackest Panic Day of All. Record 16,410,000 shares traded. No bids at last prices. No bids--no bids". By the end of the crash, Bouvier had lost half of the $250,000 (equivalent to $4,687,500 today) inheritance he received from his parents nine months before the crash.

His retirement was short-lived because a year later he joined his uncle's firm, M.C. Bouvier & Co., members of the New York Stock Exchange, as a general partner. His uncle wisely unloaded most of his common stock positions before the 1929 crash, thereby preserving much of his $7,000,000 wealth (equivalent to $131,250,000 today). Upon his uncle's death in 1935, the firm was dissolved.

Bouvier worked as a trial attorney for 40 years, specializing in contracts, testamentary law, torts, securities, and stock exchanges. He served as general counsel for the Aetna Life Insurance Company, the Travelers Insurance Company, the Equitable Life Insurance Company, and the Metropolitan Street Railway Company.

== Personal life ==
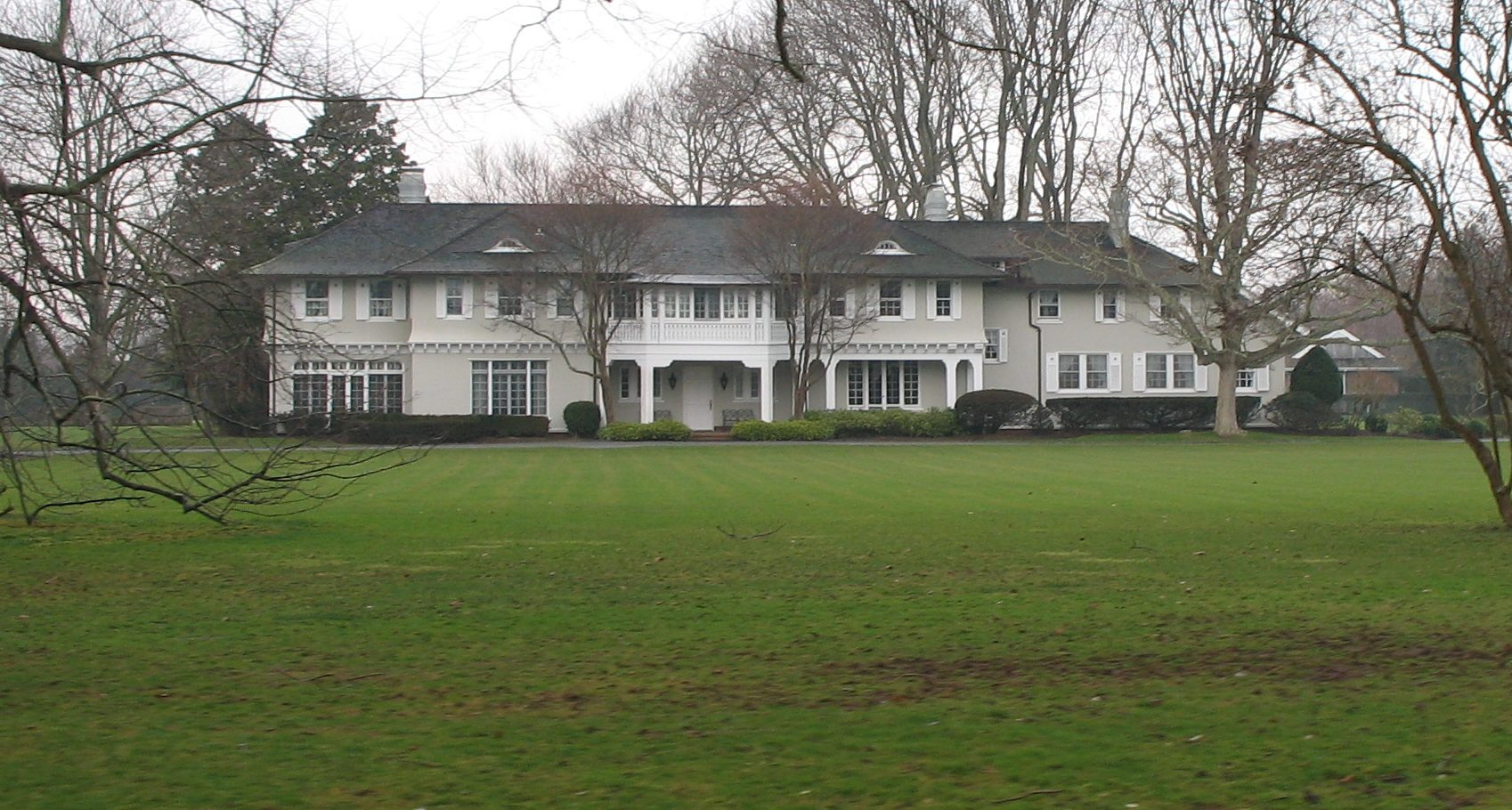
Bouvier's East Hampton home Lasata.

On April 16, 1890, Bouvier was married to Brearley School graduate Maude Frances Sergeant (1869–1940). She was the daughter of British born merchant William Roberts Sergeant and Edith Matilda (née Leaman) Sergeant. Together, they lived at Woodcroft, an estate in Nutley, New Jersey built in 1895, and, later, at 521 Park Avenue in New York, and were the parents of five children:

- John Vernou Bouvier III (1891–1957), who married Janet Norton Lee, daughter of real estate developer James T. Lee, in 1928. They divorced in Reno, Nevada in July 1940.
- William Sergeant "Bud" Bouvier (1893–1929), a 1915 Yale graduate who died in Los Olivos, California.
- Edith Ewing Bouvier (1895–1977), who married Phelan Beale Sr. in 1917. (Note: Beale's grandfather, John Dennis Phelan, a Justice of the Supreme Court of Alabama, administered the oath of office to Jefferson Davis when he became president of the Confederate States of America in 1861.) They separated in 1931 and he obtained a "Mexican divorce" in 1946.
- Michelle Caroline Bouvier (1905–1987), a twin of Maude. She married Henry Clarkson Scott in 1926. They divorced in 1939 and she remarried to Harrington Putnam Jr. (1906–1978) in 1946. In 1955, they also divorced.
- Maude Reppelin Bouvier (1905–1999), a twin of Michelle. She was married to stockbroker John Ethelbert Davis (1900–1966), a half-brother of Flora Curzon, Lady Howe.

Around 1910, Bouvier bought a home on Long Island, known as Wildmoor on Apaquogue Road in the Georgica Pond section of East Hampton. In 1925, his wife bought the much larger estate, known as Lasata, (Note: Lasata was also the name of Bouvier's uncle's summer home in Narragansett Pier, Rhode Island.) which was built for George Schurman in 1917. The home was two blocks from the ocean and three from the Maidstone Club, where he was a member in 1926. He entertained many friends, including Columbia President Nicholas Murray Butler, Judge Samuel Seabury among others, on a grand scale in East Hampton and was well known in society there.

He was a member of the Maryland Society of Cincinnati (admitted in 1918), the Sons of the Revolution (of which he was General-President for two terms), and the Military Order of the Loyal Legion of the United States. He served on the boards of the New York Foundling Hospital and the New-York Historical Society and was a member of the Union Club of the City of New York for over 50 years.

His wife died at their home, 765 Park Avenue in Manhattan, in April 1940, a few weeks before their 50th wedding anniversary. Bouvier died at the same home almost eight years later on January 15, 1948. He was buried at Most Holy Trinity Catholic Cemetery in East Hampton.

=== Descendants ===
Through his eldest son John, he was the grandfather of First Lady of the United States Jacqueline Kennedy Onassis (who married John F. Kennedy in 1953 and Aristotle Onassis in 1968) and socialite Lee Radziwill, who married Prince Stanisław Albrecht Radziwiłł. Through his daughter Edith, he was the grandfather of Edith Bouvier Beale, Phelan Beale, Jr., and Bouvier Beale. Through his daughter Maude, he was the grandfather of author John Hagy Davis.
