= Most Holy Trinity Catholic Cemetery =

Cemetery in Suffolk County, New York, US

Coordinates: 40°58′44″N 72°12′16″W

Most Holy Trinity Catholic Cemetery is a Catholic cemetery in East Hampton, New York associated with Most Holy Trinity (formerly Saint Philomena) Catholic Church in East Hampton. The cemetery is on Cedar Street north of the village and a mile (1.6 km) north of the church.

It is known for being the burial ground for the paternal ancestors and relatives of First Lady of the United States Jacqueline Kennedy Onassis, although she herself is buried not at Most Holy Trinity but next to her first husband, President John F. Kennedy, in Arlington National Cemetery.

== Notable burials ==
- John Vernou Bouvier III (1891–1957) – Jacqueline Kennedy Onassis' father
- John Vernou Bouvier Jr. (1865–1948) – Jacqueline Kennedy Onassis' paternal grandfather
- Edith Ewing Bouvier Beale (1895–1977) – Jacqueline Kennedy Onassis' aunt immortalized in the documentary Grey Gardens
- Philip Barry, Sr. (1896–1949) – Author
- Lee Bouvier Radziwill (1933–2019) – Jacqueline Kennedy Onassis' sister
- Jean Kennedy Smith (1928-2020) - Joseph P and Rose Kennedy's eighth child, sister to President John F. Kennedy and sister-in-law to Jacqueline Kennedy Onassis
