= Grey Gardens (2009 film) =

2009 HBO film directed by Michael Sucsy

- Promotional poster
- Genre: Biographical drama
- Teleplay by: Michael Sucsy; Patricia Rozema
- Story by: Michael Sucsy
- Directed by: Michael Sucsy
- Starring: Drew Barrymore; Jessica Lange; Jeanne Tripplehorn; Malcolm Gets; Daniel Baldwin; Ken Howard; Arye Gross; Justin Louis
- Music by: Rachel Portman
- Country of origin: United States
- Original language: English

Production
- Executive producers: Lucy Barzun Donnelly; Rachael Horovitz; Michael Sucsy
- Producer: David Coatsworth
- Cinematography: Mike Eley
- Editors: Alan Heim; Lee Percy
- Running time: 104 minutes
- Production companies: Locomotive Films; Flower Films
- Budget: $12 million

Original release
- Network: HBO
- Release: April 18, 2009

Grey Gardens is a 2009 American biographical drama television film about the lives of Edith Bouvier "Little Edie" Beale, played by Drew Barrymore, and her mother Edith Ewing "Big Edie" Bouvier, played by Jessica Lange. Co-stars include Jeanne Tripplehorn as Jacqueline Kennedy, Little Edie's cousin, and Ken Howard as Phelan Beale, Little Edie's father. The film, directed by Michael Sucsy and co-written by Sucsy and Patricia Rozema, flashes back and forth between various events and dates ranging from Little Edie as a young débutante in 1936 moving with her mother to their Grey Gardens estate through the filming and premiere of the 1975 documentary about their lives, Grey Gardens. Filming began on October 22, 2007.

Grey Gardens premiered on HBO on April 18, 2009 to unanimous applause from critics. It was nominated for 17 Primetime Emmy Awards, winning six including Outstanding Television Movie, Outstanding Lead Actress (for Lange) and Outstanding Supporting Actor (for Howard). It was also nominated for three Golden Globe Awards, winning two for Best Television Movie and Best Actress (for Barrymore). Its lead duo were also nominated for Screen Actors Guild Awards, with Barrymore winning.

== Plot ==
The film is based on the life stories of the eccentric paternal aunt and first cousin of Jackie Kennedy, both named Edith Bouvier Beale. The elder Edith Bouvier Beale was the sister of Jackie Kennedy's father John Vernou Bouvier III and was nicknamed "Big Edie" while her daughter was called "Little Edie". The Beale women were members of New York City's high society but in their later years they withdrew from city life, living at their Long Island summer home/estate Grey Gardens. The house fell into a state of disrepair that gave the Beale women notoriety.

Through flashbacks, we are shown the history of the family's move into the estate. Phelan Beale, husband of Big Edie and father of Little Edie, eventually divorced his wife. In the movie, Little Edie decides to move to New York to pursue a career in acting and an ill-fated romance with high-profile married man Julius "Cap" Krug. Her father tells her that she has to find a husband to support her lifestyle. Little Edie sadly and slowly realizes her fate is to remain her mother's companion at Grey Gardens. After Phelan dies, their two sons tell their mother that there is little money and she should sell the estate and move to Florida. Despite her sons' attempt to help, Big Edie pridefully declares that the house is in her name, and that the only way she'll leave is if she dies. The two women become reclusive and known around town as the highly eccentric proprietors of the home, which has become decrepit and full of stray animals which are taken in by the Beale women. Because of this, the Suffolk County, New York health department comes with a warrant to inspect the mansion and see how it is overrun by cats, raccoons, and mountains of garbage. This causes them to condemn the property and put an eviction notice on the door.

Soon after, Jackie visits and is shocked by the home's condition and by the oddball behavior of the women. Seeing as how she does not want to let the location or many of her childhood memories be taken down, she and her sister, Lee Radziwill, pay for the cleanup and restoration of the mansion.

During one of Radziwill's trips to the mansion, she introduces Big and Little Edie to documentarians Albert and David Maysles, who are making a film about her. A year later, the Maysles come back and say that Radziwill stopped cooperating but they decided that since they found Big and Little Edie to be the most interesting parts of the footage they shot, they asked to do one on them. The film then depicts the filming of various scenes of the documentary, Grey Gardens. When the documentary is finished, Little Edie plans to attend the premiere but her mother tries to discourage it out of spite and the two women fight before Little Edie escapes. Finding one of Big Edie's favorite cats, Whiskers, Little Edie goes back to her and Big Edie tearfully realizes that she has held her daughter back from having a life. She proclaims that she should have let her stay in New York. Reconciling, Big Edie gives her blessing for Little Edie to attend the premiere, and gives her her wedding earrings and necklace to wear, as she intended to give them to her when she got married. As Little Edie attends the premiere, she receives a standing ovation from the audience after its conclusion. Back at the mansion, Big Edie receives a call from Walter Goodman of The New York Times, and when he asks if he can get a comment from her of what she thinks about the Maysles film, she says, "No, Mr. Goodman, it's all in the movie", before she hangs up on him. She laughs as she repeats her last remark to Whiskers.

The movie ends with Little Edie singing "Tea for Two" at the Reno Sweeney cabaret in Greenwich Village and the quote "My mother gave me a truly priceless life."

== Cast ==
- Drew Barrymore as Edith "Little Edith" Bouvier Beale
- Jessica Lange as Edith "Big Edith" Bouvier Beale
- Jeanne Tripplehorn as Jacqueline Kennedy Onassis
- Ken Howard as Phelan Beale
- Kenneth Welsh as Max Gordon
- Arye Gross as Albert Maysles
- Justin Louis as David Maysles
- Daniel Baldwin as Julius Krug
- Malcolm Gets as George "Gould" Strong
- Louis Grise as Young Buddy Beale
- Joshua Peace as Adult Buddy Beale
- Neil Babcock as Young Phelan Beale Jr.
- Ben Carlson as Adult Phelan Beale Jr.
- Olivia Waldriff as Young Jackie Bouvier
- Neil Girvan as The Concierge

== Production ==
Michael Sucsy said that he used primary sources to flesh out the story including letters and journals kept by Little Edie. He also interviewed family members and friends, including Lois Wright who lived in the house and wrote her own book about the events. Albert Maysles is credited as a source in the movie.

Sucsy said that the house facade as well as the interior were created from blueprints. Sucsy said that an aerial shot of the house circa 1936 was historically accurate on the placement of the house in relation to other mansions in East Hampton at the time (although requiring CGI enhancements to create the illusion). As with many movies based on historical events, some events in the Beales' lives, such as the timing of Big Edie and Phelan's divorce, were shifted to make a more coherent story.

The entire film was shot in Ontario, with most of the shots in metropolitan Toronto. The Valley Halla Estate in Rouge Park was the setting of exterior shots of Grey Gardens. Waterfront shots were on Centre Island in the Toronto Islands. Hotel shots were at the Fairmont Royal York. Studio work was done at Toronto Film Studios.

The aerial shot of The Pierre was licensed from An Affair to Remember.

Post-production was done in New York and Los Angeles. The DVD commentary was done in the same studio where the Maysles mixed the original documentary.

== Reception ==
=== Critical response ===
The movie has been lauded by many critics. Review aggregator Rotten Tomatoes reports that 100% out of 10 professional critics gave the film a positive review. Ben Lyons from At the Movies said: "Drew Barrymore is fantastic in this film." Rolling Stone critic Peter Travers also raved: "The script hits a few bumps, but Jessica Lange and Drew Barrymore are magnificent as the bizarro Beales. Barrymore is a revelation. Aging into her 60s and transformed in voice and bearing, she finds Edie's unquenchable spirit. Brava."

=== Awards and nominations ===
Year	Award	Category	Nominee(s)	Result	Ref.
2009	Artios Awards	Outstanding Achievement in Casting – Television Movie	Ellen Parks and Robin D. Cook	Won	
2009	Online Film & Television Association Awards	Best Motion Picture		Won	
2009	Online Film & Television Association Awards	Best Actress in a Motion Picture or Miniseries	Drew Barrymore	Won	
2009	Online Film & Television Association Awards	Best Actress in a Motion Picture or Miniseries	Jessica Lange	Nominated	
2009	Online Film & Television Association Awards	Best Supporting Actor in a Motion Picture or Miniseries	Ken Howard	Nominated	
2009	Online Film & Television Association Awards	Best Supporting Actress in a Motion Picture or Miniseries	Jeanne Tripplehorn	Nominated	
2009	Online Film & Television Association Awards	Best Direction of a Motion Picture or Miniseries	Michael Sucsy	Won	
2009	Online Film & Television Association Awards	Best Writing of a Motion Picture or Miniseries	Michael Sucsy and Patricia Rozema	Won	
2009	Online Film & Television Association Awards	Best Ensemble in a Motion Picture or Miniseries		Nominated	
2009	Online Film & Television Association Awards	Best Costume Design in a Motion Picture or Miniseries		Won	
2009	Online Film & Television Association Awards	Best Editing in a Motion Picture or Miniseries		Nominated	
2009	Online Film & Television Association Awards	Best Lighting in a Motion Picture or Miniseries		Won	
2009	Online Film & Television Association Awards	Best Makeup/Hairstyling in a Motion Picture or Miniseries		Won	
2009	Online Film & Television Association Awards	Best Music in a Motion Picture or Miniseries		Won	
2009	Online Film & Television Association Awards	Best Production Design in a Motion Picture or Miniseries		Won	
2009	Online Film & Television Association Awards	Best Sound in a Motion Picture or Miniseries		Nominated	
2009	Primetime Emmy Awards	Outstanding Made for Television Movie	Lucy Barzun Donnelly, Rachael Horovitz, Michael Sucsy, and David Coatsworth	Won	
2009	Primetime Emmy Awards	Outstanding Lead Actress in a Miniseries or a Movie	Drew Barrymore	Nominated	
2009	Primetime Emmy Awards	Outstanding Lead Actress in a Miniseries or a Movie	Jessica Lange	Won	
2009	Primetime Emmy Awards	Outstanding Supporting Actor in a Miniseries or a Movie	Ken Howard	Won	
2009	Primetime Emmy Awards	Outstanding Supporting Actress in a Miniseries or a Movie	Jeanne Tripplehorn	Nominated	
2009	Primetime Emmy Awards	Outstanding Directing for a Miniseries, Movie or Dramatic Special	Michael Sucsy	Nominated	
2009	Primetime Emmy Awards	Outstanding Writing for a Miniseries, Movie or Dramatic Special	Michael Sucsy and Patricia Rozema	Nominated	
2009	Primetime Creative Arts Emmy Awards	Outstanding Art Direction for a Miniseries or Movie	Kalina Ivanov, Brandt Gordon, and Norma Jean Sanders	Won (Note: Tied with James Merifield, Paul Ghirardani, and Deborah Wilson for Little Dorrit.)	
2009	Primetime Creative Arts Emmy Awards	Outstanding Casting for a Miniseries, Movie or Special	Ellen Parks and Robin D. Cook	Nominated	
2009	Primetime Creative Arts Emmy Awards	Outstanding Cinematography for a Miniseries or Movie	Mike Eley	Nominated	
2009	Primetime Creative Arts Emmy Awards	Outstanding Costumes for a Miniseries, Movie or Special	Catherine Marie Thomas and Mickey Carleton	Nominated	
2009	Primetime Creative Arts Emmy Awards	Outstanding Hairstyling for a Miniseries or Movie	Jenny Fifield-Arbour and Nancy E. Warren	Won	
2009	Primetime Creative Arts Emmy Awards	Outstanding Makeup for a Miniseries or Movie (Non-Prosthetic)	Linda Dowds, Susan Hayward, and Vivian Baker	Nominated	
2009	Primetime Creative Arts Emmy Awards	Outstanding Prosthetic Makeup for a Series, Miniseries, Movie or Special	Vivian Baker, Linda Dowds, Bill Corso, and Sean Sansom	Won	
2009	Primetime Creative Arts Emmy Awards	Outstanding Music Composition for a Miniseries, Movie or Special (Original Dramatic Score)	Rachel Portman	Nominated	
2009	Primetime Creative Arts Emmy Awards	Outstanding Single-Camera Picture Editing for a Miniseries or Movie	Alan Heim and Lee Percy	Nominated	
2009	Primetime Creative Arts Emmy Awards	Outstanding Sound Mixing for a Miniseries or Movie	Henry Embry and Rick Ash	Nominated	
2009	Satellite Awards	Best Motion Picture Made for Television		Won	
2009	Satellite Awards	Best Actress in a Miniseries or Motion Picture Made for Television	Drew Barrymore	Won	
2009	Satellite Awards	Best Actress in a Miniseries or Motion Picture Made for Television	Jessica Lange	Nominated	
2009	Television Critics Association Awards	Outstanding Achievement in Movies, Miniseries and Specials		Won	
2009	Women Film Critics Circle Awards	Best Theatrically Unreleased Movie by or About Women		Won	
2009	Women's Image Network Awards	Outstanding Mini-Series / Made for Television Movie		Won	
2009	Women's Image Network Awards	Outstanding Actress Made for Television Movie / Mini-Series	Jessica Lange	Nominated	
2010	American Cinema Editors Awards	Best Edited Miniseries or Motion Picture for Television	Alan Heim and Lee Percy	Won	
2010	Art Directors Guild Awards	Excellence in Production Design Award – Television Movie or Mini-series	Kalina Ivanov, Brandt Gordon, Colin Woods, Tucker Doherty, Jason Clarke, Jeff Helgason, and Jean Sanders	Won	
2010	Cinema Audio Society Awards	Outstanding Achievement in Sound Mixing for Television Movies and Miniseries	Henry Embry and Rick Ash	Won	
2010	Costume Designers Guild Awards	Outstanding Made for Television Movie or Miniseries	Catherine Marie Thomas	Won	
2010	Critics' Choice Awards	Best Picture Made for Television		Won	
2010	Directors Guild of America Awards	Outstanding Directorial Achievement in Movies for Television or Miniseries	Michael Sucsy	Nominated	
2010	Dorian Awards	TV Drama of the Year		Won	
2010	Dorian Awards	Campy Flick of the Year		Nominated	
2010	Dorian Awards	TV Performance of the Year: Drama	Drew Barrymore	Won	
2010	Golden Globe Awards	Best Miniseries or Television Film		Won	
2010	Golden Globe Awards	Best Actress – Miniseries or Television Film	Drew Barrymore	Won	
2010	Golden Globe Awards	Best Actress – Miniseries or Television Film	Jessica Lange	Nominated	
2010	Gracie Awards	Outstanding Female Actor in a Leading Lead in a Drama Special	Drew Barrymore	Won	
2010	Producers Guild of America Awards	David L. Wolper Award for Outstanding Producer of Long-Form Television	Lucy Barzun Donnelly, Rachael Horovitz, Michael Sucsy, and David Coatsworth	Won	
2010	Screen Actors Guild Awards	Outstanding Performance by a Female Actor in a Miniseries or Television Movie	Drew Barrymore	Won	
2010	Screen Actors Guild Awards	Outstanding Performance by a Female Actor in a Miniseries or Television Movie	Jessica Lange	Nominated	
2010	Writers Guild of America Awards	Long Form – Original	Michael Sucsy and Patricia Rozema	Nominated	
2019	Online Film & Television Association Awards	Hall of Fame – Television Programs		Inducted	

== Soundtrack ==
Grey Gardens: Music composed by Rachel Portman

Soundtrack album by Various artists
- Released: May 5, 2009 (US); June 2, 2009 (Overseas)
- Labels: Varèse Sarabande; UMG (distribution)
- Producer: Stewart Lerman

The Academy Award-winning composer Rachel Portman provided the film score. In addition to Prague Philharmonic Orchestra, the album includes vocal performances by the movie's lead actresses, Jessica Lange (on "We Belong Together" and "I Won't Dance" sung with Malcolm Gets) and Drew Barrymore (on "Tea for Two").

=== Track list ===
No.	Title	Featured artist	Length
1.	"Virginia Military Institute Song"	Prague Philharmonic Orchestra	1:00
2.	"Little Edie on Chair"	Prague Philharmonic Orchestra	2:45
3.	"Love Is Divine"	Prague Philharmonic Orchestra	1:21
4.	"Edie Come Home"	Prague Philharmonic Orchestra	2:23
5.	"Cements the Deal"	Prague Philharmonic Orchestra	1:14
6.	"Nobody Stuck Anybody Anywhere"	Prague Philharmonic Orchestra	2:14
7.	"Wedding Jewels"	Prague Philharmonic Orchestra	3:26
8.	"I Might Have"	Prague Philharmonic Orchestra	1:23
9.	"Extraordinary Determination"	Prague Philharmonic Orchestra	1:11
10.	"Your Father's Died"	Prague Philharmonic Orchestra	0:57
11.	"Feet First"	Prague Philharmonic Orchestra	2:52
12.	"Invite You In for Tea"	Prague Philharmonic Orchestra	2:45
13.	"She Was Gorgeous"	Prague Philharmonic Orchestra	1:40
14.	"We Belong Together"	Jessica Lange & Malcolm Gets	1:08
15.	"I Won't Dance"	Jessica Lange & Malcolm Gets	1:14
16.	"We Belong Together"	Jessica Lange	1:41
17.	"Young Edie in NYC"	Prague Philharmonic Orchestra	0:38
18.	"Raid"	Prague Philharmonic Orchestra	1:57
19.	"This Will Be Better"	Prague Philharmonic Orchestra	2:30
20.	"All the Luck in the World"/"Love Is Divine"	Prague Philharmonic Orchestra	2:11
21.	"Trust Has Run Out"	Prague Philharmonic Orchestra	1:13
22.	"Long Leash"	Prague Philharmonic Orchestra	0:54
23.	"Tea for Two"	Drew Barrymore	1:29
Total length:			39:36

=== Additional credits ===
- Jeff Atmajian – orchestrator
- Stephanie Diaz-Matos – music supervisor
- Chris Dibble – scoring mixer
- Jim Dunbar – music supervisor
- James Fitzpatrick – orchestra contractor (Tadlow Music)
- Bob Garrett – singing coach (Lange & Barrymore)
- Simon Haram – musician (soprano sax)
- Jan Holzner – assistant scoring engineer
- Alex Hustoles – musician (clarinet)
- Evyen J. Klean – music consultant
- Jaromir Klepac – musician: piano
- Stewart Lerman – music mixer, music producer (on-screen songs)
- Petr Matejak – concert master
- Yann McCullough – auricle operator
- Randall Poster – music supervisor
- Jennifer Reeve – music coordinator
- George Seara – recordist (on-screen songs)
- Jiri Simunek – music preparation
- David Snell – conductor
- Erich Stratmann – music editor
- Stanja Vomockava – music translator
- Chris Cozens – auricle control systems (uncredited)
- Philip Tallman – music editor (uncredited)
- Youki Yamamoto – music associate (uncredited)
