= Edith Bouvier Beale =

American socialite and cabaret performer (1917–2002)

Edie Beale
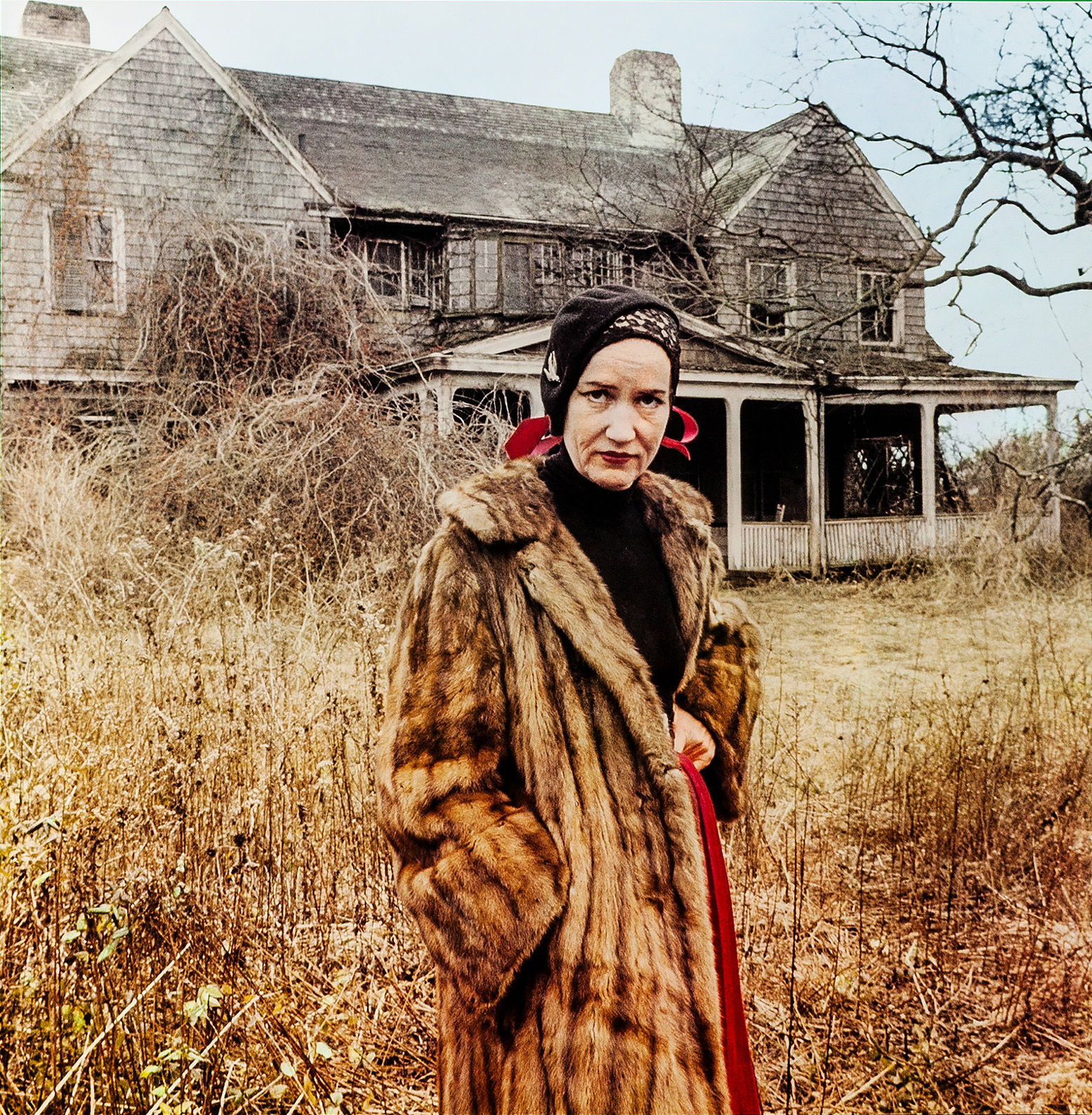
- Beale c. 1975, in front of the Grey Gardens estate. Photo by Herb Goro during the filming of Grey Gardens (1976)
- Born: Edith Bouvier Beale; November 7, 1917; New York City, U.S.
- Died: c. January 14, 2002 (aged 84) (Note: Beale was found dead on January 14, 2002, and this is recorded as her date of death on her tombstone. However, an article published at the time of her death, citing a relative, reported that she may have died about "five days" before her body was found.); Bal Harbour, Florida, U.S.
- Burial place: Locust Valley Cemetery, Locust Valley, New York, U.S.
- Other name: Little Edie
- Occupations: Model; cabaret performer
- Parent(s): Phelan Beale; Edith Ewing Bouvier Beale
- Family: Bouvier family

Edith "Edie" Bouvier Beale (November 7, 1917 – c. January 14, 2002), nicknamed Little Edie, was an American socialite and fashion model. She was the elder first cousin of former U.S. First Lady Jacqueline Kennedy and Princess Lee Radziwill. Beale is known for participating along with her mother Edith Ewing Bouvier Beale in the 1975 documentary film Grey Gardens, by Albert and David Maysles.

== Early life ==
Beale was born on November 7, 1917, in Manhattan, New York City, the only daughter of Phelan Beale, a lawyer, and Edith Ewing Bouvier, a singer and socialite. Her mother (known as "Big Edie") was a daughter of Phelan's law partner, John Vernou Bouvier Jr. She was born at 987 Madison Avenue, New York City (now the site of the Carlyle Hotel). Beale had two younger brothers, Phelan Beale Jr. and Bouvier Beale, and a lavish upbringing as part of America's "Catholic aristocracy." She would attend The Spence School until the age of 11 when her mother pulled her out due to respiratory illness. She went on to graduate from Miss Porter's School in Farmington, Connecticut in 1935.

Between the 1920s to the 1930s, Beale developed alopecia totalis which caused her body hair to fall out, later prompting her to wear headscarves.

At 17, Beale attempted to pursue a career in modeling, successfully landing a modeling job for a New York Macy's. However, her father was immensely against the idea of his daughter being on public display. The following year, she made her debut as a debutante when she was presented to society during a ball at the Pierre Hotel on New Year's Day 1936. The New York Times reported on the event, where she wore a gown of white net appliqued in silver, with a wreath of gardenias in her hair.

While Beale was young, her mother pursued a singing career, hiring an accompanist and playing at small venues and private parties. In the summer of 1931, Phelan Beale separated from his wife, then 35 years old. In 1946, he finally obtained a divorce, notifying his family by telegram from Mexico.

Beale circa 1940

== Adult life and return to East Hampton ==
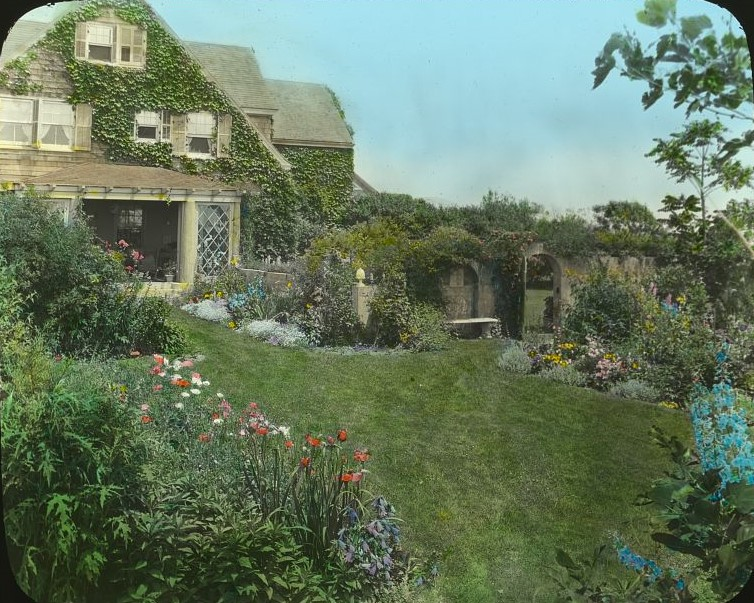
Grey Gardens, Joseph Greenleaf Thorp, architect, 1897. Landscape by Anna Gilman (Mrs. Robert C.) Hill.

As an adult, Beale dated aviator Howard Hughes, and according to her, had proposals from J. Paul Getty and Joseph P. Kennedy Jr. (although in reality she met him only once). In 1947, a year after her parents' divorce, Beale moved back to New York City into an apartment and later the Barbizon Hotel for Women. While in New York, Beale met producer Max Gordon, who encouraged her to audition for Theatre Guild. Waiting to audition in 1952, she once again embarked on her career as a model, quickly landing a modeling job with Bachrach Studios, much to her father's dismay.

Before she was able to audition, her mother commanded she return to East Hampton, claiming to be ill. On July 29, 1952, with the insistence of her mother, Beale permanently returned to live with her mother at their East Hampton estate, Grey Gardens.

In October 1971, police raided Grey Gardens and found the house "full of litter, rife with the odor of cats, and in violation of various local ordinances." The Suffolk County, New York Board of Health prepared to evict Beale and her mother due to the unsafe condition of the property. Following the publicity, Beale's cousin Jacqueline Kennedy paid a reported $25,000 to refurbish the property, settle back taxes, and give Beale and "Big Edie" a stipend (the two women's trust fund income had run out some years before). The eviction proceedings were dropped.

=== Grey Gardens ===
In 1972, Beale's cousin Lee Radziwill hired documentary filmmakers Albert and David Maysles to work on a film about the Bouvier family. At the outset, the brothers filmed Beale and her mother. The original film project was not completed, and Radziwill kept the footage that had been shot of the Beales. However, the Maysles were fascinated by the strange life the two women led. In the fall of 1973, after raising funds for film and equipment on their own, they returned and filmed 70 more hours of footage with Beale and Big Edie. The Beale's were paid $5,000 for their participation. The resulting 1975 film, Grey Gardens, is widely considered a masterpiece of the documentary genre.

The original 1972 footage, featuring Radziwill visiting the Beales, was released in 2017 as That Summer.

== Later life and death ==
After the premiere of Grey Gardens, Beale was approached by nightclub owner James T. Maxcy to star in her own show at his Greenwich Village nightclub, Reno Sweeney, guaranteeing her a minimum pay of $1,500. She opened her six-day cabaret on January 10, 1978, which consisted of her renditions of "Tea for Two" and "As Time Goes By" amongst others, followed by a question and answer session with the audience.

After her mother's death in 1977, Beale had put their Grey Gardens estate on the market for $500,000, before taking it off the market after no one bid higher than $200,000. In 1979, Beale sold the mansion to journalist Sally Quinn and former executive editor of The Washington Post Ben Bradlee for $220,000 on the condition that the home not be demolished.

Beale then moved to the coach home of a friend in Southampton, and then a year later to Manhattan. In both cities, she enjoyed a flourishing social life, though was at times reprimanded by her cousin, Jackie, for being too public with their family's intimate life. She then moved to Ormond Beach, and then Miami, where she would frequent Torpedo, a gay bar on the beach, due to the admiration she received from the patrons. Some nights, the bar would organize screenings of Grey Gardens, after which Beale would give a live performance. Though both Beale and patrons alike enjoyed these performances, Beale discontinued them at the instruction of an unnamed relative. She moved to Montreal after the deaths of Jackie and her brothers due to her fear that there was a conspiracy against her family; she claimed that the Kennedys were responsible. Beale later moved to live with friends in Oakland, California before finally settling in Bal Harbor.

When friends did not hear from Beale around the New Year, they called the complex she had been living in, who then sent somebody to check on her. Beale was found dead in her apartment on January 14, 2002, aged 84. It is believed she had died about five days earlier, either from a stroke or heart attack. The inscription on her grave marker reads: "I came from God. I belong to God. In the end, I shall return to God."

== Legacy ==
Interest in the Beales' story resulted in a variety of publishing and media projects, as well as various mentions in popular culture. Designer Calvin Klein has said he was influenced by Beale's "strange fashion sense". In 1997, Harper's Bazaar produced an eight page spread inspired by Beale's fashions.

Rufus Wainwright's 2001 album Poses features a song entitled "Grey Gardens". The track begins with an audio sample of one of Beale's lines from the documentary: "It's very difficult to keep the line between the past and the present. Do you know what I mean?". The Spring 2010 issue of the online literary journal BigCityLit features a pantoum by American poet Joel Allegretti called "The Belles of Grey Gardens", which is made up entirely of dialogue from the Maysles' documentary.

- In the off-Broadway Grey Gardens musical, first produced in March 2006, Beale was portrayed by Christine Ebersole, Sara Gettelfinger, and Erin Davie. In other renditions of the play, Beale is portrayed by Jenna Russell (London, 2016) and Rachel York (Los Angeles, 2016).
- In the 2009 HBO production of the same name as the documentary, Beale is portrayed by Drew Barrymore.
- In the 2011 episode of 30 Rock titled "Mrs. Donaghy," Liz Lemon (portrayed by Tina Fey) does an impression of Barrymore's portrayal of Little Edie.
- A February 2013 episode of RuPaul's Drag Race, drag queen Jinkx Monsoon portrayed Little Edie during the Snatch Game challenge. Inspired by that episode, Jinkx Monsoon and Peaches Christ mounted a live 90-minute musical drag parody Return to Grey Gardens.
- The first episode of the IFC mockumentary series Documentary Now! spoofed Grey Gardens in 2015, with Fred Armisen and Bill Hader as mother and daughter in Sandy Passage.
