= Lee Radziwill =

American socialite (1933–2019)

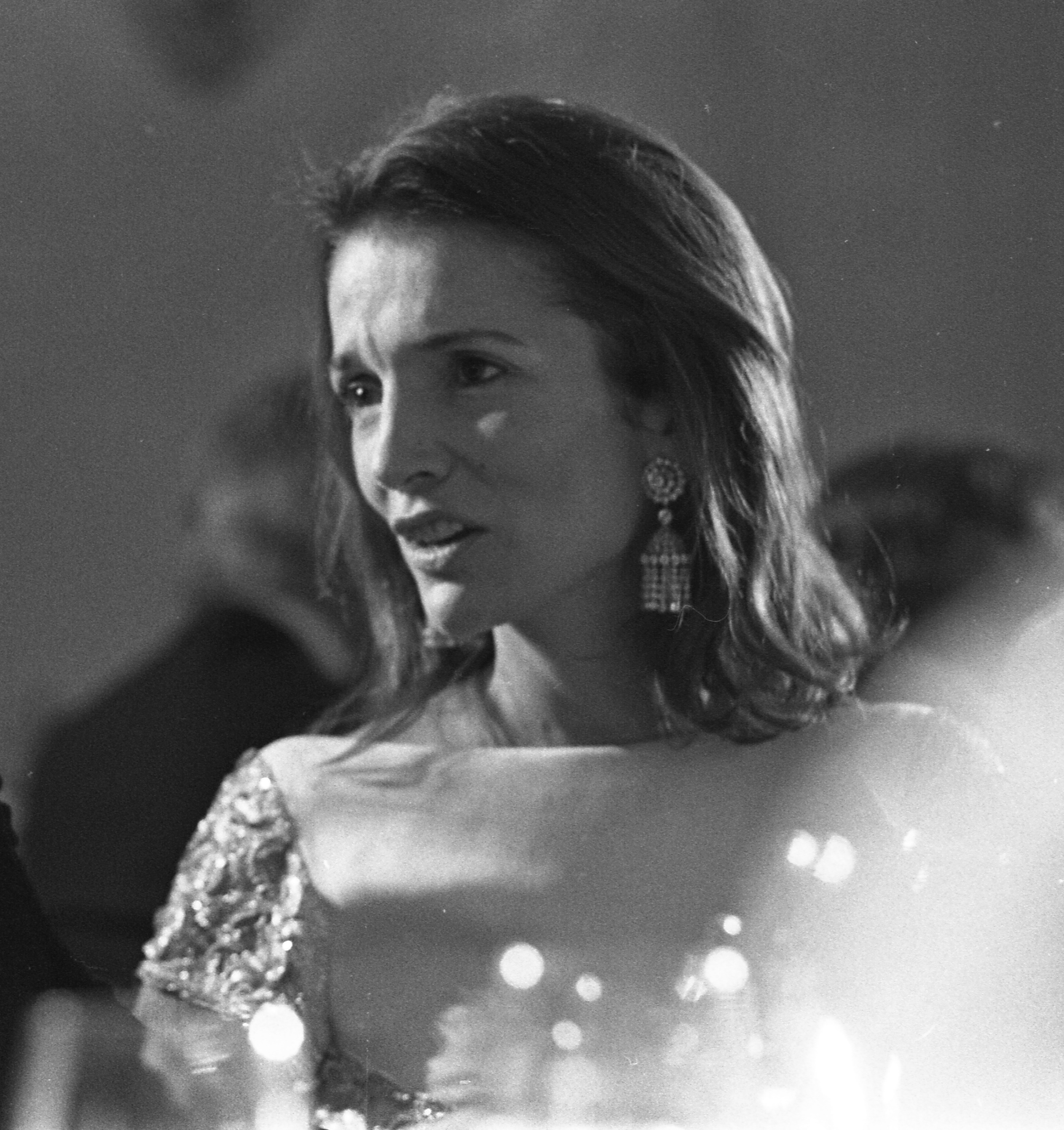
- Radziwill in 1974
- Born: Caroline Lee Bouvier; March 3, 1933; New York City, U.S.
- Died: February 15, 2019 (aged 85); New York City, U.S.
- Burial place: Most Holy Trinity Catholic Cemetery
- Education: Chapin School; Potomac School; Miss Porter's School
- Alma mater: Sarah Lawrence College (BA)
- Occupations: Public relations executive; Interior decorator
- Spouse: Michael Temple Canfield (m. 1953; div. 1958) Prince Stanisław Albrecht Radziwiłł (m. 1959; div. 1974) Herbert Ross (m. 1988; div. 2001)
- Children: Prince Anthony Stanisław Albert Radziwiłł; Princess Anna Christina Radziwiłł
- Parents: John Vernou Bouvier III; Janet Norton Lee
- Family: Bouvier family

Princess Caroline Lee Radziwill (née Bouvier; March 3, 1933 – February 15, 2019), previously known as Lee Canfield and later known as Lee Ross, was an American socialite, public relations executive, and interior designer. She was the younger sister of former First Lady Jacqueline Kennedy and sister-in-law of President John F. Kennedy.

== Early life ==
Caroline Lee Bouvier was born at Doctors Hospital in Yorkville, Manhattan, to stockbroker John Vernou Bouvier III and socialite Janet Norton Lee. (Note: Though some sources say she was born in Southampton, the New York Times of 14 March 1933 reported that "A daughter was born to Mr. and Mrs. John Vernou Bouvier 3d on March 3 at the Doctors Hospital". New York City is likely correct, as she was born in late winter; Southampton is a summer retreat.) She attended the Chapin School, in New York City, Potomac School in Washington, D.C., Miss Porter's School in Farmington, Connecticut, and pursued undergraduate studies at Sarah Lawrence College. In her birth announcement, and from her earliest years, she was known by her middle name "Lee" rather than "Caroline".

== Career ==
Considered by "New York's society arbiters and editors" as the city's leading debutante, Radziwill had her coming out party in 1950. A full-page photograph of her in her gown was featured in the "debutante" section of Life magazine (page 71) in the December 25, 1950 issue.

During the 1960s, Radziwill attempted a career as an actress. Her acting attempt was unsuccessful, if highly publicized. She featured in the 1967 production of The Philadelphia Story as the spoiled Main Line heiress Tracy Lord. The play was staged at the Ivanhoe Theatre in Chicago, and Radziwill's performance was much criticized. A year later, she appeared in a television adaptation of the 1944 movie Laura, which was also criticized.

A London townhouse and a manor house in Buckinghamshire, Turville Grange (which she owned and shared with her second husband), had both been decorated by Italian stage designer Lorenzo Mongiardino and were greatly admired and frequently photographed by Cecil Beaton and Horst P. Horst. She worked briefly as an interior decorator in a style influenced by her association with Mongiardino. Her clientele were wealthy; she once decorated a house "for people who would not be there more than three days a year". She frequented celebrity company, including travelling with the Rolling Stones during their 1972 tour of North America, which she attended alongside the writer Truman Capote.

Radziwill was named to the Vanity Fair International Best Dressed Hall of Fame in 1996. Her Paris (49, Avenue Montaigne) and Manhattan (160 East 72nd Street) apartments were featured in the April 2009 issue of Elle Décor magazine. She was interviewed by director Sofia Coppola in February 2013 about her life as part of Radziwill's cover story for T: The New York Times Style Magazine as well as about Coppola's movie The Bling Ring and the loss of privacy. She was listed as one of the 50 best-dressed people older than age 50 by The Guardian in March 2013.

== Family ==
Radziwill hired documentary filmmakers Albert and David Maysles in 1972 to work on a movie about the Bouvier family. At the outset, the brothers filmed two eccentric and reclusive members of the extended family, Radziwill's aunt and cousin, Edith Ewing Bouvier Beale ("Big Edie") and her daughter Edith Bouvier Beale ("Little Edie"). The Beales lived in a rambling, decaying home in East Hampton, New York, and were funded by other members of the family.

Radziwill's original movie project was suspended, and she retained the footage of the Beales. However the Maysles brothers saw the cinematic potential of the two women and their peculiar lives, and after raising funds for film and equipment of their own, returned and recorded many hours of new footage with Big Edie and Little Edie—the resulting 1975 film Grey Gardens is widely ranked among best of the documentary genre. The film was adapted as a 2006 musical of the same name, where the characters Lee and Jackie Bouvier appear as visiting children in retrospect. HBO produced the 2009 television movie Grey Gardens based on the lives of the Beales.

Surviving footage of Radziwill's 1972 visit to the Beales was included in the 2017 film That Summer.

== Personal life and death ==
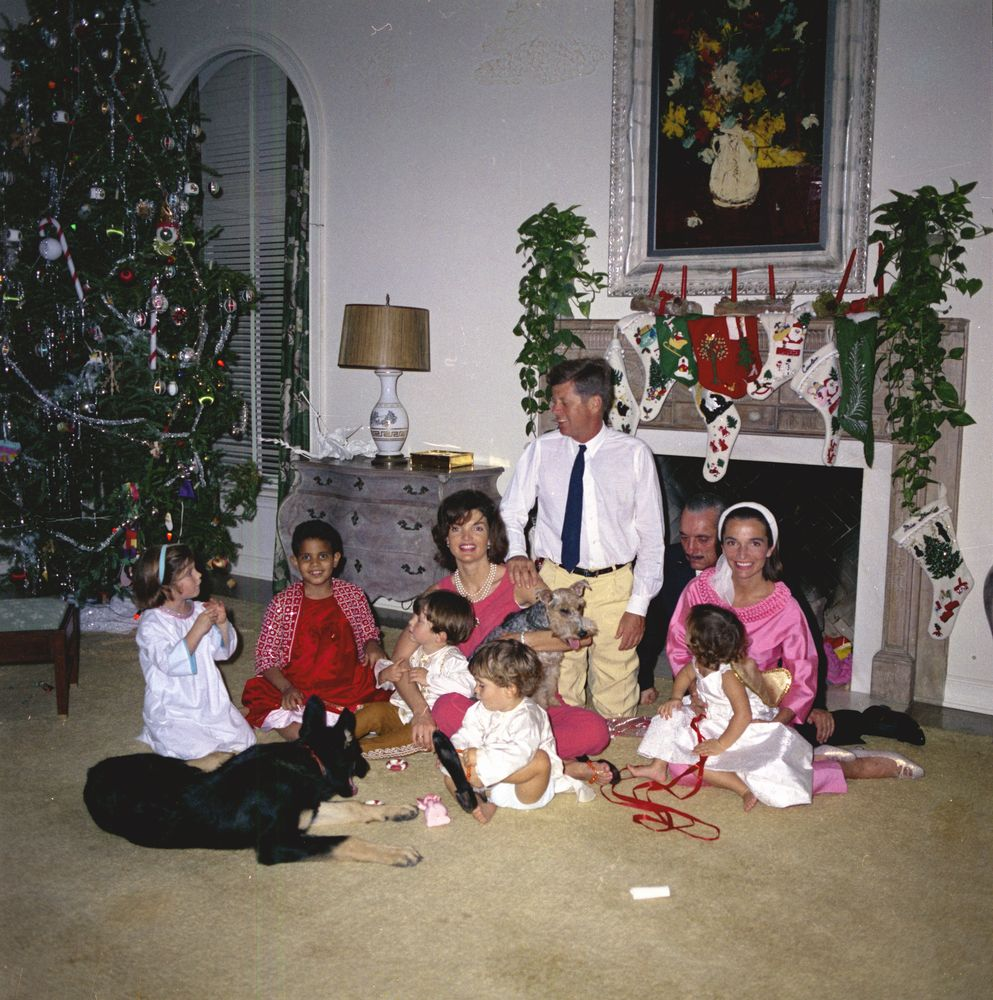
Lee Radziwill and husband Stanisław Albrecht Radziwiłł with President John F. Kennedy and other family on Christmas Day 1962 in Palm Beach, Florida

Radziwill was married three times. Her first marriage, in April 1953, was to Michael Temple Canfield, a publishing executive. They divorced in 1958, and the marriage was declared annulled by the Sacred Rota in November 1962. According to the memoirs of Loelia, Duchess of Westminster, Edward VIII believed that Canfield was actually the biological son of his brother Prince George, Duke of Kent (the fourth son of King George V and uncle of Elizabeth II) and Kiki Preston.

Her second marriage, on March 19, 1959, was to the Polish aristocrat Prince Stanisław Albrecht Radziwiłł, member of the House of Radziwill, who divorced his second wife, the former Grace Maria Kolin (Grace later married William Ward, 3rd Earl of Dudley as his third wife. Dudley's second wife was Viscountess (Frances) Laura Long née Charteris who later married Michael Temple Canfield, Lee's first husband) and received a Roman Catholic annulment of his first marriage to re-marry. Since his second marriage had never been acknowledged by the Roman Catholic Church, no annulment was necessary. Upon her marriage, she began to use the title of Her Serene Highness Princess Caroline Lee Radziwiłł and was sometimes referred to as Princess Radziwill in the American press. However, the Second Polish Republic had abolished the legal recognition of noble titles in the March Constitution of 1921 (article 96), with the effect that the Radziwills were pretenders to the title. They had two children, Anthony (1959–1999) and Anna Christina (b. 1960). Their marriage ended in divorce in 1974.

Radziwill had an affair with the British politician Roy Jenkins. In 1976, The New York Times reported Peter Francis Tufo, a lawyer and real estate developer, was a "frequent escort" of Radziwill.

On September 23, 1988, Radziwill married for a third time, becoming the second wife of American movie director and choreographer Herbert Ross. Their divorce was finalized during 2001; he died later that year, and she returned to using Radziwill, a transcription of her children's name, Radziwiłł.

Lee Radziwill died on February 15, 2019, aged 85, in her apartment on the Upper East Side of Manhattan.

== In popular culture ==
- Radziwill was portrayed by Calista Flockhart in Feud: Capote vs. The Swans (2024).

== Books ==
- Happy Times. New York: Assouline. 2001. p. 168. ISBN 978-1614280545.
- Radziwill, Lee (2015). Lee. Foreword by Peter Beard, introduction by Richard David Story. New York: Assouline Publishing. p. 188. ISBN 978-1-61428-469-7.
