= Georgica Pond =

Coastal lagoon in New York, United States

Coordinates: 40.938156°N 72.229614°W

Georgica Pond is a 290-acre (1.2 km^{2}) coastal lagoon on the west border of East Hampton Village and Wainscott, New York, and was the site of a Summer White House of Bill Clinton in 1998 and 1999.

The lagoon is separated by a 50-foot (15 m) sandbar and is managed by the East Hampton Trustees who monitor a cycle of draining the lagoon and replenishing it with Atlantic Ocean water. The Lagoon consists of 6 finger like coves shooting out from the main body of water, Georgica Cove, Eel Creek, Goose Creek, Talmage Creek, Seabury Creek, and Jones Creek.

Celebrities on its banks include Steven Spielberg, Ronald Perelman, developer Harry Macklowe and formerly Martha Stewart and Calvin Klein.

Bill and Hillary Clinton stayed at the Spielberg home during the summer vacations in 1998 and 1999. Rumors circulated in 1998 that the Secret Service had drained the pond looking for submarines after the lagoon drained shortly after Clinton's visit.

Groyne jetties at the pond have been accused of causing beach erosion in Southampton, New York as they are thought to interrupt the normal east to west flow of sand in the longshore drift. Dunehampton unsuccessfully attempted to incorporate in part to have legal standing in the debate. Likewise, Sagaponack, New York incorporated for the same reason.

In the 1960s and 1970s, Georgica Pond was involved in a tradition known as "letting" that was carried out by local Indigenous peoples. This entails discharging fresh water from the pond into a bay or ocean. This was an issue primarily because it was thought to disturb the pond's ecosystem and lower the water table in the area. This addition of saltwater and anadromous species into the pond could be detrimental to the Pond's living ecosystem. However, in the Georgica Pond case, "letting" done in the late 1980s and 1990s relieved flooding and made the pond more ecologically sound. It was found that letting seemed to be an overall benefit to the pond's ecology. It was also found that letting made flooding less frequent and lessened the magnitude of the flood.

Georgica Pond is where the famed Grey Gardens estate is located.

A sandy area near the pond is a nesting ground for the piping plover.
