= East Hampton (village), New York =

East Hampton Village, New York
- Village; Town Seat of East Hampton
- Incorporated Village of East Hampton
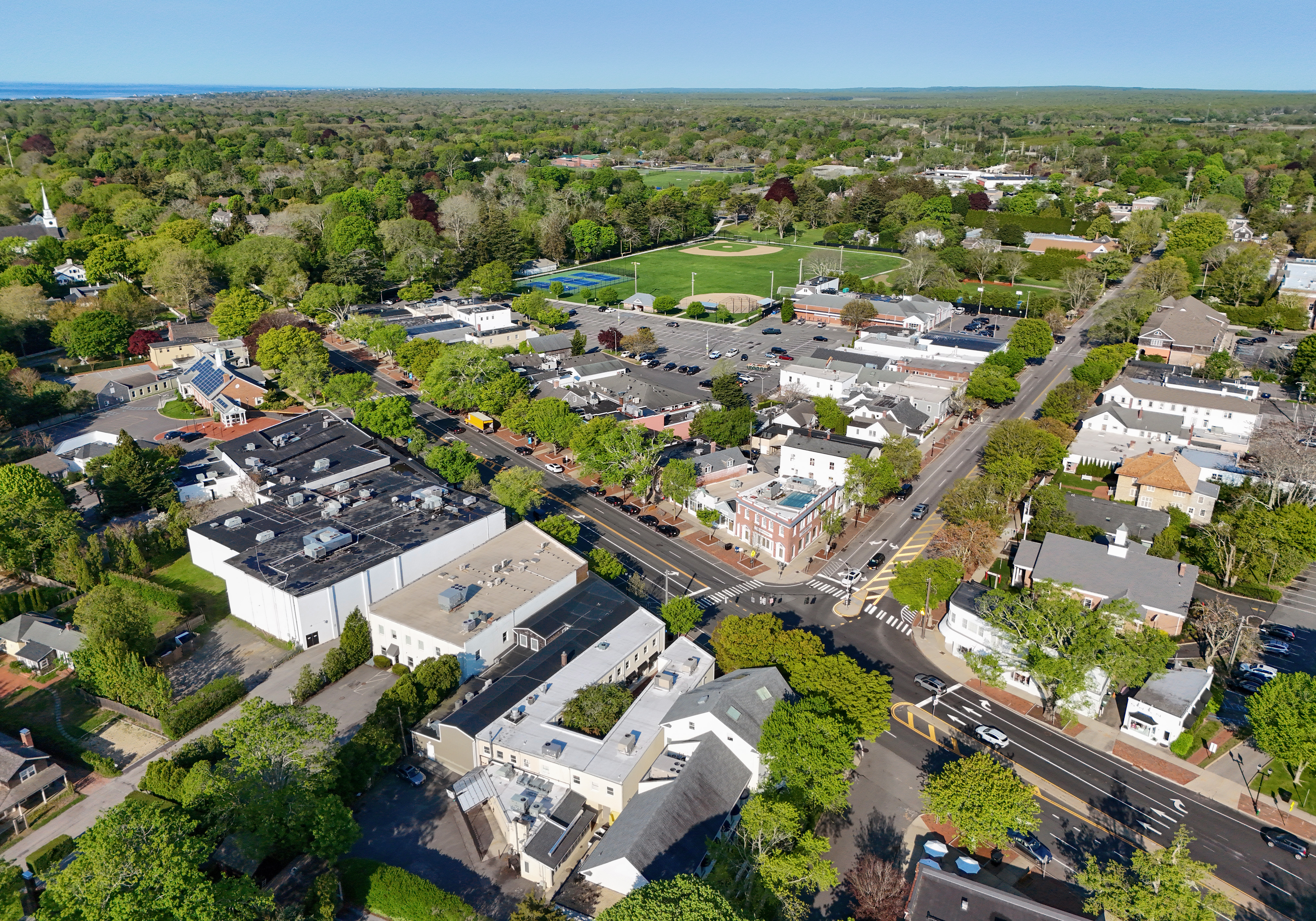
- Aerial view of the village in 2025

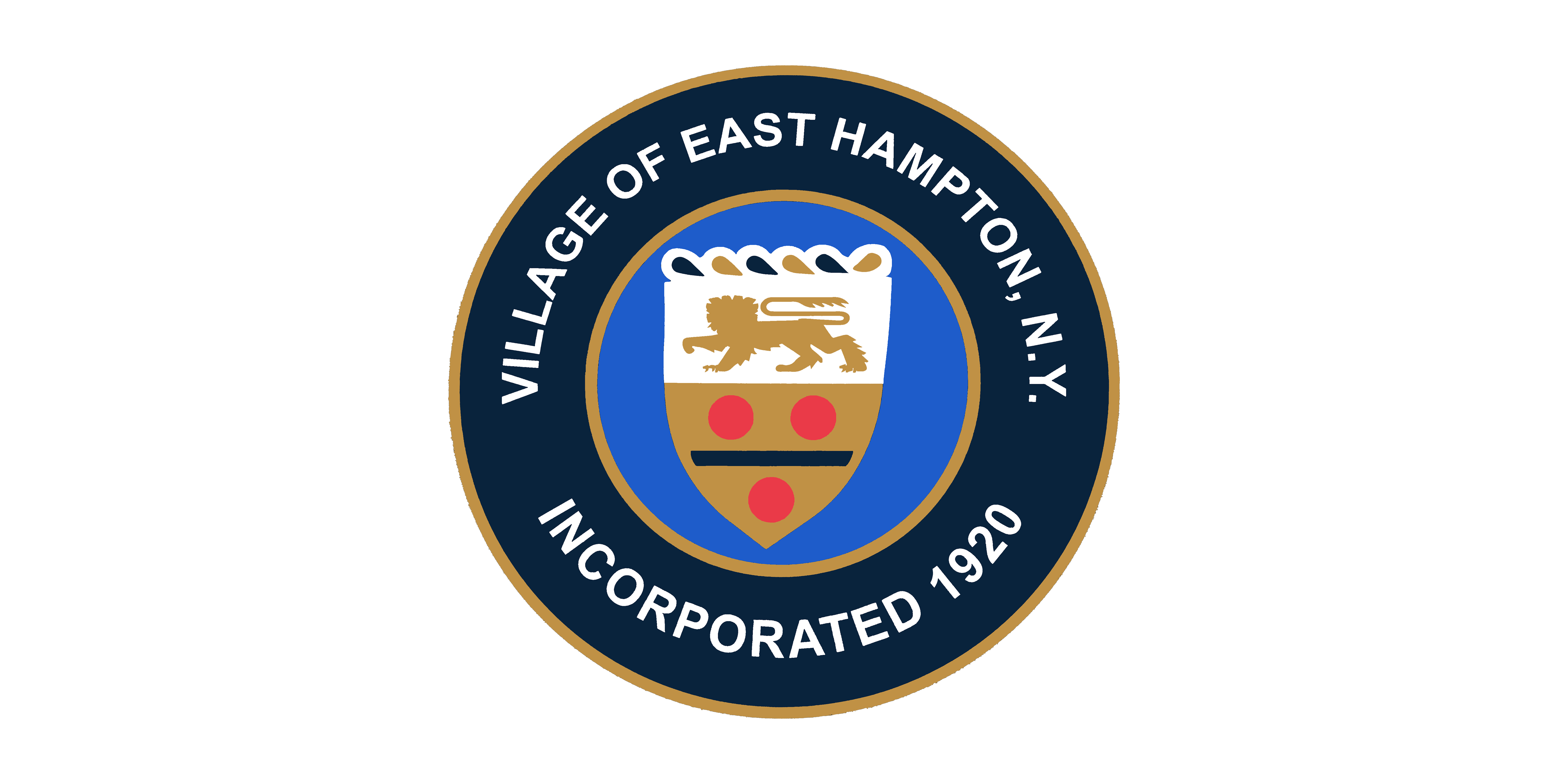
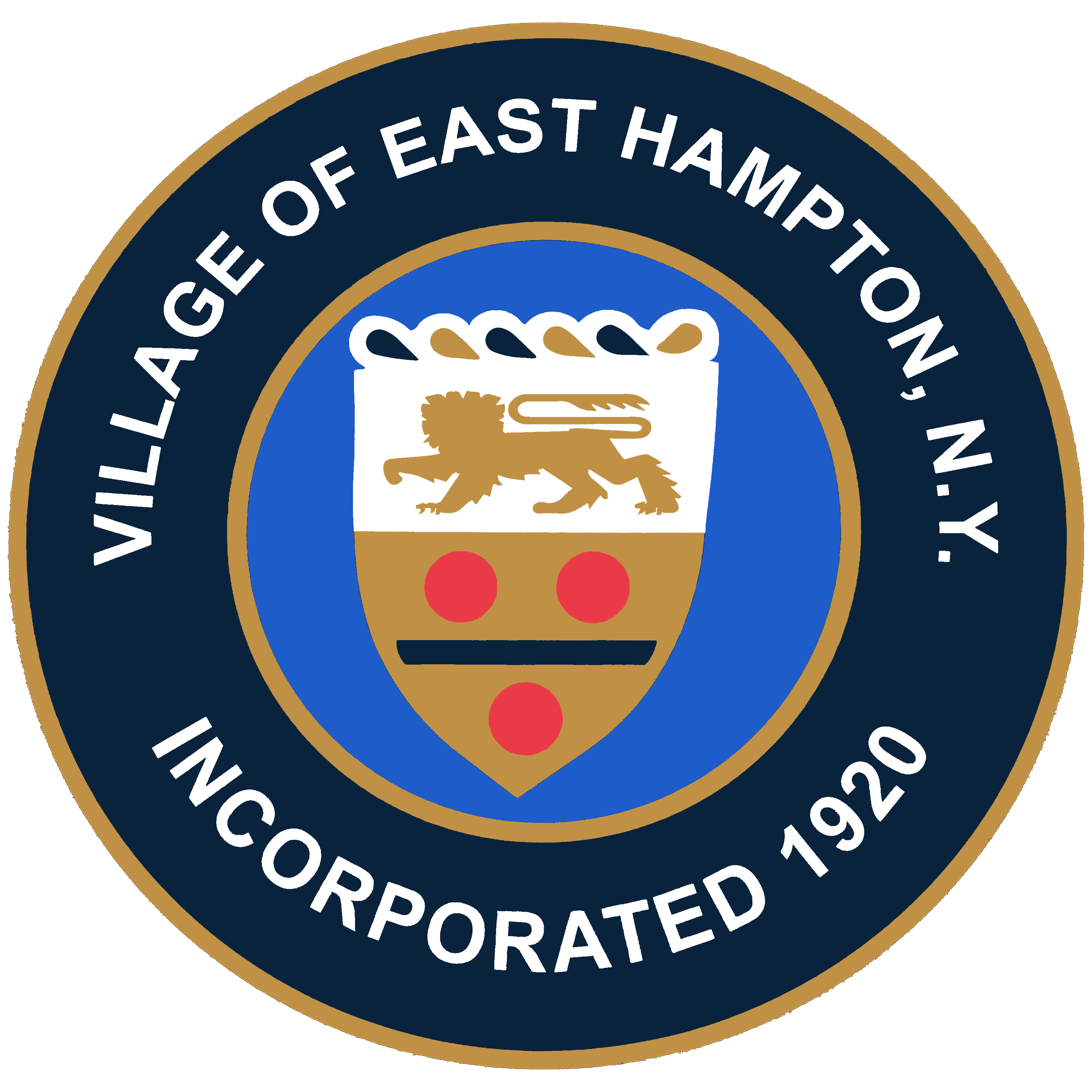
- Flag Seal
- Motto: America's Most Beautiful Village
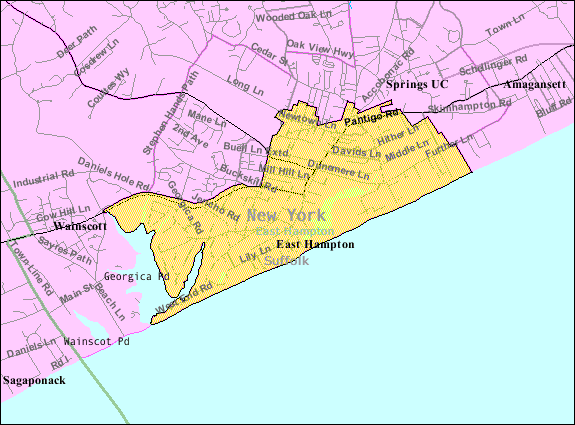
- U.S. Census map of East Hampton

- Location on Long Island Location within the state of New York Location within the contiguous United States
- Coordinates: 40°57′09″N 072°11′46″W
- Country: United States
- State: New York
- County: Suffolk
- Town: East Hampton
- Founded: 1648
- Incorporated: 1920

Government
  - Mayor: Jerry Larsen (NewTown Party)

Area
  - Total: 4.91 sq mi (12.71 km^{2})
  - Land: 4.77 sq mi (12.35 km^{2})
  - Water: 0.14 sq mi (0.36 km^{2})
- Elevation: 26 ft (8 m)

Population (2020)
  - Total: 1,517
  - Density: 318.1/sq mi (122.81/km^{2})
- Time zone: UTC-5 (Eastern (EST))
  - Summer (DST): UTC-4 (EDT)
- ZIP code: 11937
- Area codes: 631, 934
- FIPS code: 36-22183
- GNIS feature ID: 2391650
- Website: easthamptonvillage.gov

The Village of East Hampton is a village in Suffolk County, New York. It is located in the town of East Hampton on the South Fork of eastern Long Island. The population was 1,083 at the time of the 2010 census, 251 less than in the year 2000. It is a center of the upscale residential and summer resort area at the East End of Long Island known as The Hamptons. The Mayor of East Hampton Village is Jerry Larsen, elected on September 15, 2020.

== History ==
=== 17th century ===
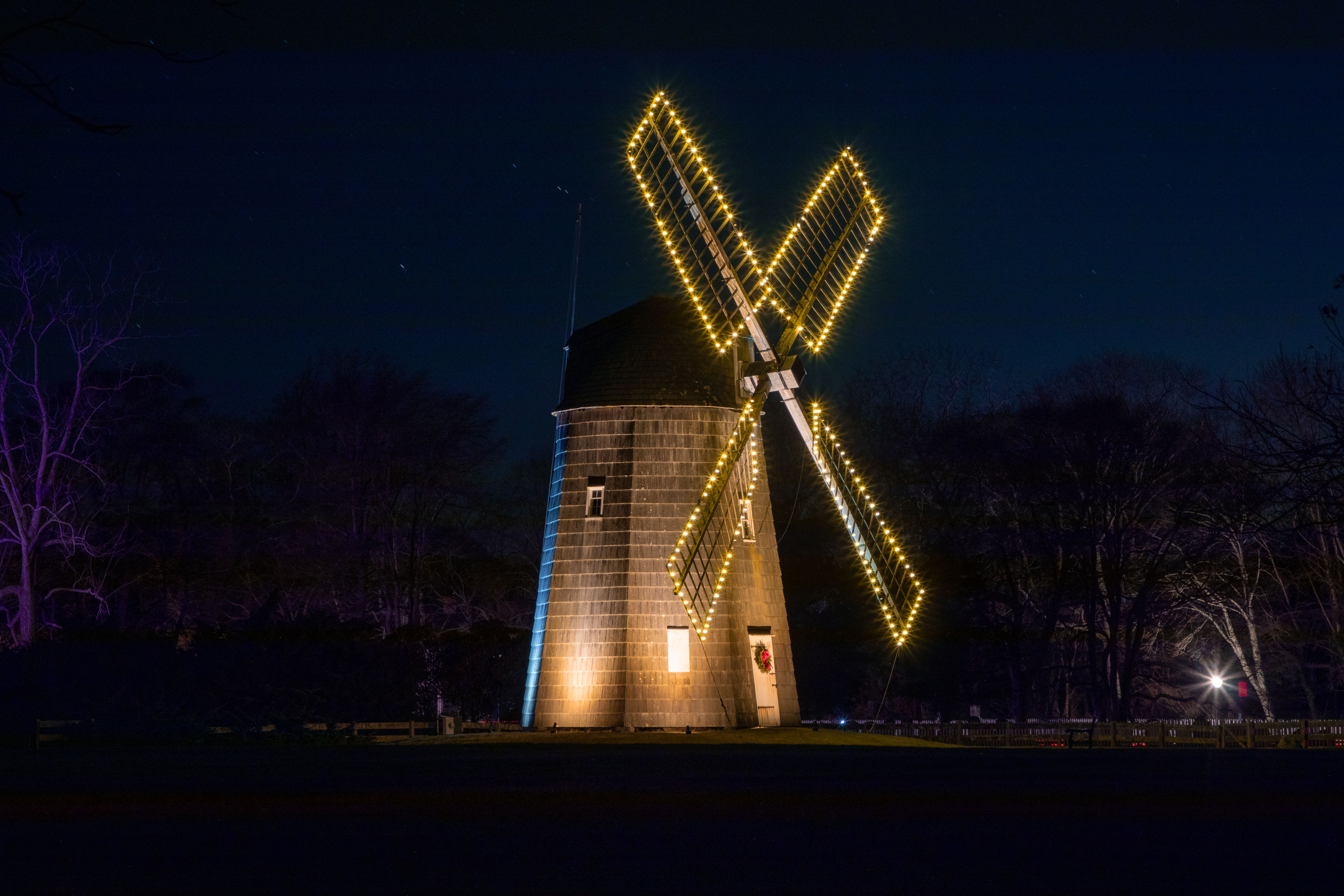
Gardiner Windmill, located within East Hampton Village

The village of Easthampton was founded in 1648 by Puritan farmers who worshipped as Presbyterians. The community was based on farming, with some fishing and whaling. Whales that washed up on the beach were butchered, and whales were hunted offshore with rowboats sometimes manned by Montauk Indians. The lack of a good harbor in East Hampton, however, resulted in Sag Harbor becoming a whaling center which sent ships to the Pacific.

The land had been purchased in 1648 by the governors of Connecticut Colony and New Haven Colony from the Montauk Indians, in large part for small drills to make wampum, their traditional industry; hunting and fishing rights were retained. It was then sold for about £30 to settlers, some from Lynn and Salem, Massachusetts, who had not found room for their herds in Massachusetts Bay Colony. The original name for the village was Maidstone, from a village in Kent where some of the settlers may have originated. Each original settler was allotted a village lot of several acres and rights in common to surrounding lands which were regulated by the town government. The area was transferred to the jurisdiction of New York in 1664.

In large part, early settlers in East Hampton were unacquainted with one another. A great deal of jockeying for position resulted, which took the form of legal proceedings conducted by the town government. Summaries of these proceedings were recorded by the town clerk and form the major resource for historians studying East Hampton during the 17th Century; there are few other written records such as diaries.

The witchcraft accusation against Elizabeth Garlick began in East Hampton.

=== 19th century ===
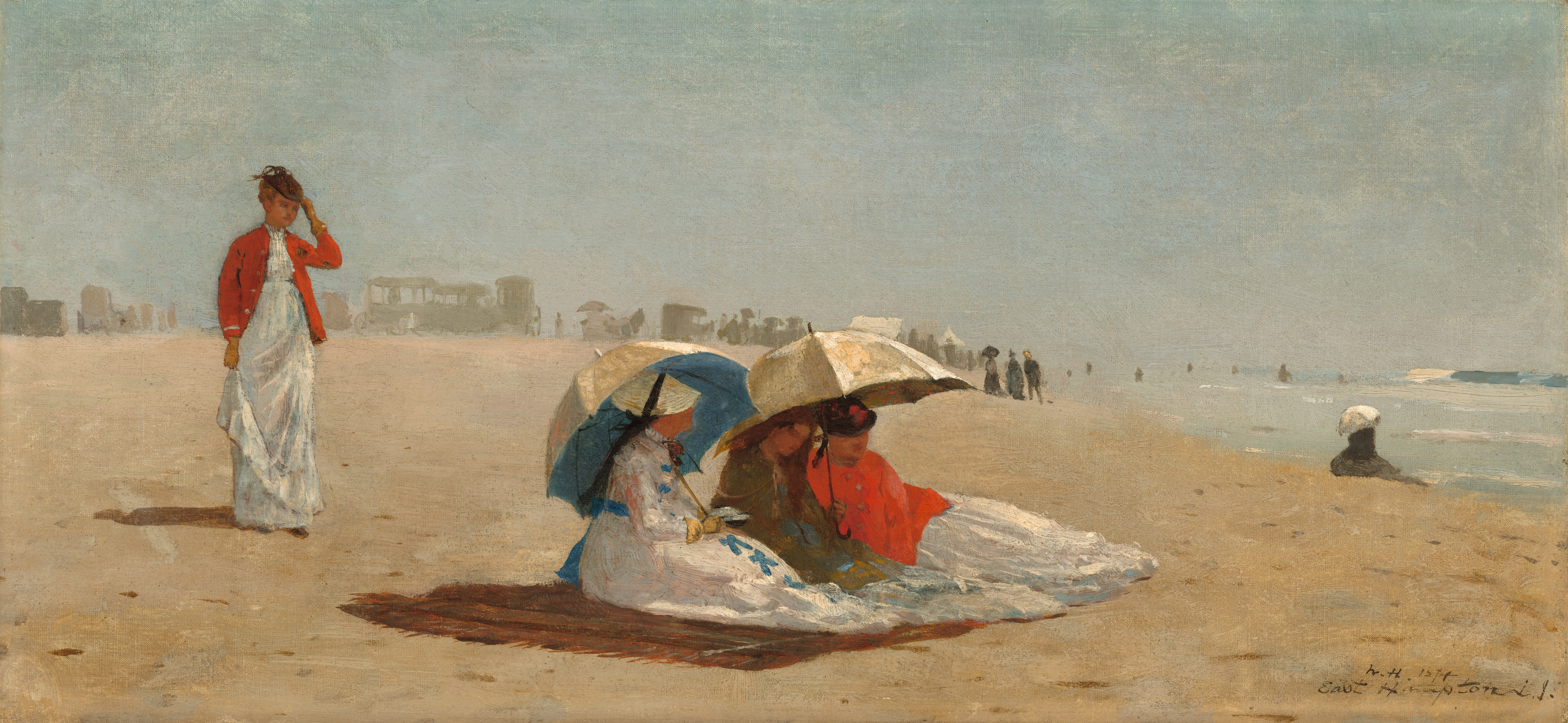
East Hampton Beach in 1874, by Winslow Homer

In the late 19th century, after extension of the railway to Bridgehampton in 1870 by predecessors of the Long Island Rail Road, visitors began to summer, at first in boarding houses on Main Street, then in "cottages," which sometimes were substantial estates, built on former farms and pastures in the village. Shingle style architecture was popular from the 1880s. By the early 1890s the prices being commanded for cottage sites, as high as $10 thousand an acre, were the object of comment by the editors of The New York Times. The Montauk Branch of the railroad was extended through East Hampton to Montauk in 1895.

=== 20th century ===
It was during the 1910s and 20s that most luxury estates were built by the very wealthy, mostly in the Eastern Plain, a previously undeveloped agricultural area. The privately circulated Blue Book of the Hamptons informed, and continues to inform, fashionable residents as to who is who. The Great Depression and World War II resulted in a lull, but full-scale building of cottages resumed in the 1950s and some of the large estates began to be broken up. By 1968 the exclusive character of the "Summer Colony" had become so diluted by the merely rich that the column of that name in The East Hampton Star was discontinued.

The quaint windmills and other sights were favored by artists and art students from the 1890s. It became an artists' colony in the mid-20th century, popularized by the Abstract Expressionists.

=== 21st century ===
As of the 21st century the Hamptons are a fashionable, if crowded and expensive, weekend destination during the summer season. According to Sotheby's International Realty:

Widely regarded as one of the country's most beautiful areas, with miles of white sandy beach, East Hampton is a world-famous ocean-side resort just 100 miles from New York City. The town offers a wide range of fine restaurants, boutiques, art galleries and theater. Sporting activities are enjoyed with world class country clubs, beautiful beaches, excellent sailing, fishing and riding stables.

History and surviving historic sites are detailed in "Village of East Hampton Multiple Area", a New York State study.

=== Political ===
On September 15, 2020 the retired Chief of Police Jerry Larsen was elected Mayor in a landslide victory under the Newtown Party political platform to revitalize the downtown and rebuild the village's infrastructure. His running mates Chris Minardi and Sandra Melendez Esq. became Trustees of the Village of East Hampton.

On June 21, 2022 the NewTown Party captured two more seats on the Village Board of Trustees for a 5-0 majority easily defeating the incumbent Arthur "Tiger" Graham.

== Geography ==
According to the United States Census Bureau, the village has a total area of 4.9 square miles (12.7 km^{2}), of which 4.7 square miles (12.3 km^{2}) are land, while 0.15 square miles (0.4 km^{2}), or 2.82% of the total area, is water.

The village gained some territory and lost some territory between the 1990 census and the 2000 census. The neighborhood near Georgica Pond, a tidal pond on the west side of the village is notable for its fashionable residences and high-profile residents.

== Demographics ==
Historical population
| Census | Pop. | Note | %± |
|---|---|---|---|
| 1880 | 807 | | — |
| 1930 | 1,934 | | — |
| 1940 | 1,756 | | −9.2% |
| 1950 | 1,737 | | −1.1% |
| 1960 | 1,772 | | 2.0% |
| 1970 | 1,753 | | −1.1% |
| 1980 | 1,886 | | 7.6% |
| 1990 | 1,402 | | −25.7% |
| 2000 | 1,334 | | −4.9% |
| 2010 | 1,083 | | −18.8% |
| 2020 | 1,517 | | 40.1% |
U.S. Decennial Census

As of the census of 2000, there were 1,334 people, 635 households, and 337 families residing in the village. The population density was 280.3 inhabitants per square mile (108.2/km^{2}). There were 1,745 housing units at an average density of 366.7 per square mile (141.6/km^{2}). The racial makeup of the village was 93.10% White, 1.42% Black or African American, 0.15% Native American, 1.87% Asian, 1.87% from other races, and 1.57% from two or more races. Hispanic or Latino of any race were 8.92% of the population.

There were 635 households, out of which 16.9% had children under the age of 18 living with them, 42.2% were married couples living together, 6.9% had a female householder with no husband present, and 46.9% were non-families. 36.4% of all households were made up of individuals, and 18.0% had someone living alone who was 65 years of age or older. The average household size was 2.07 and the average family size was 2.68.

In the village, the population was spread out, with 14.4% under the age of 18, 4.5% from 18 to 24, 22.6% from 25 to 44, 31.3% from 45 to 64, and 27.1% who were 65 years of age or older. The median age was 52 years. For every 100 females, there were 95.9 males. For every 100 females age 18 and over, there were 92.6 males.

The median income for a household in the village was $56,607, and the median income for a family was $62,500. Males had a median income of $41,181 versus $37,083 for females. The per capita income for the village was $51,316. About 5.5% of families and 8.2% of the population were below the poverty line, including 13.2% of those under age 18 and 5.8% of those age 65 or older.

== Beaches ==
Parking access to the Atlantic Ocean beaches within the village of East Hampton is severely restricted from May 1 to September 30. In 2006 there were only 2,600 permits available for non-residents with a charge of $250. Residents can always get parking permits.

East Hampton's beaches are highly regarded because of their clean white sands, the fact they're relatively accessible and because there is minimal development along the beach, which is strictly residential. Parking space at the village beaches is limited, which prevents crowding. Parking is prohibited on neighboring streets. There is no law that restricts people from accessing the beaches via bike, foot or being dropped off.

The beaches of East Hampton Village (from west to east):

- Georgica – This beach adjoining Georgica Pond is popular with surfers because of currents around its controversial groynes. The beach has bathroom facilities.
- Main Beach – The beach is the only one with a pavilion where one can get food; it also has a limited number of lockers available to residents.
- Wiborg Beach – Has a parking lot, and is right next to Maidstone Club. It does not have a lifeguard.
- Egypt Lane Beach – This beach is sometimes incorrectly called Maidstone Beach because of its close proximity to the headquarters of the Maidstone Golf Club. The true Maidstone Beach is on the bay outside the village in the town of East Hampton. Main, Wiborg and Egypt Lane are immediately next to the Maidstone Golf Club.
- Two Mile Hollow – This beach has the second-largest parking lot of the village beaches.

== Regulations ==
The size of homes that can be built in East Hampton is regulated. The point is to ensure that new construction is more or less compatible with size of the lot it is constructed on and the neighborhood it is located in.

== Law enforcement ==
Seal of the Village of East Hampton Police Department

Law enforcement in East Hampton is the responsibility of the East Hampton Village Police Department, chosen in 2009 for New York State accredited status. The department is located within the town of East Hampton, in Suffolk County. It is headed by Chief of Police Mike Tracey, and staffed by 24 full-time officers, 3 part-time officers, 17 public safety dispatchers, 2 full time and 17 part-time paramedics. The department has both a uniformed and detective division.

The police department building is part of the Municipal Emergency Building, located at One Cedar Street in East Hampton.

== Schools ==
- East Hampton Union Free School District
- East Hampton High School
- East Hampton Middle School
- John M. Marshall Elementary School

| Preceded by Amagansett | The Hamptons | Succeeded by Wainscott |
