= James T. Lee =

American lawyer and investor (1877–1968)

James Thomas Lee
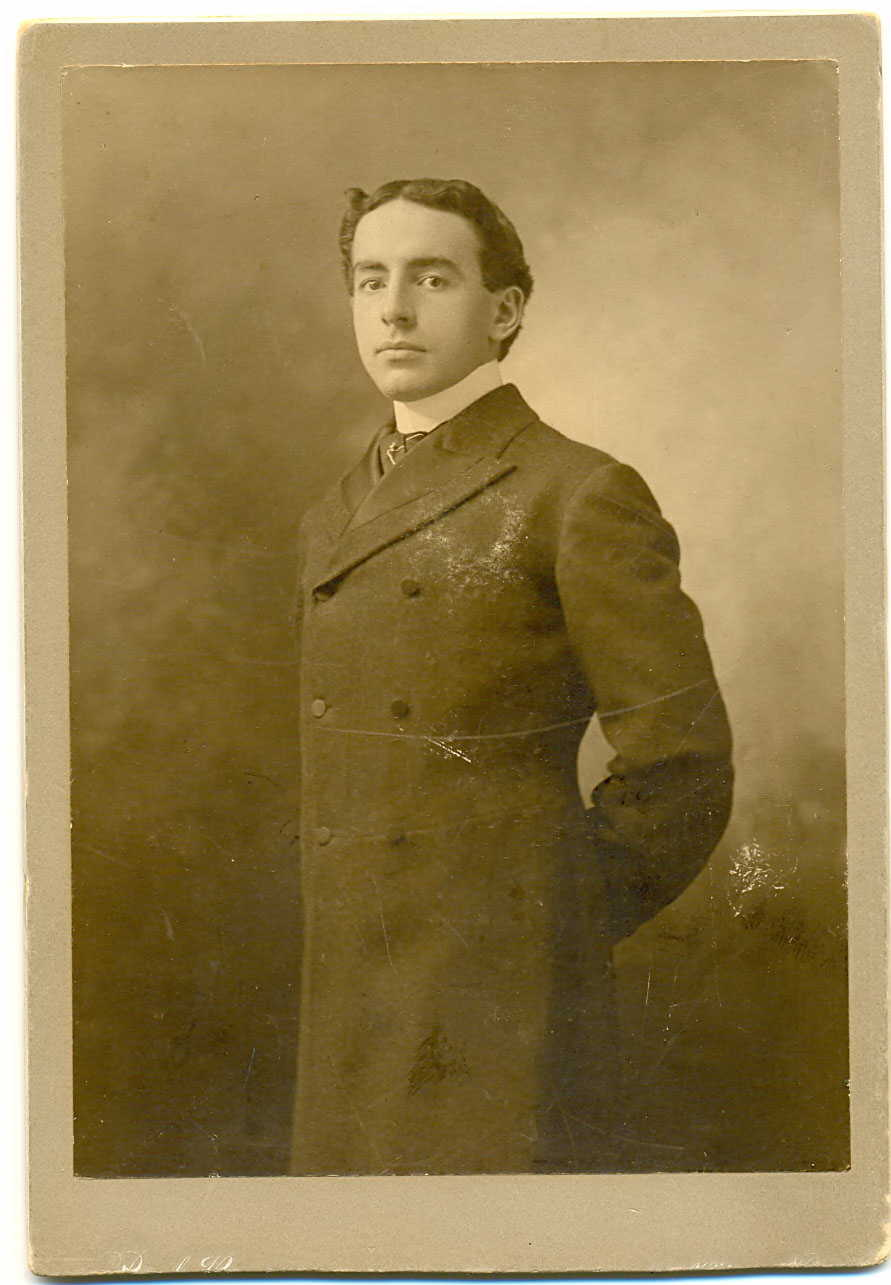
- Born: October 2, 1877; New York City, US
- Died: January 3, 1968 (aged 90); New York City, US
- Burial place: Gate of Heaven Cemetery, Hawthorne, NY
- Education: City College of New York; Columbia University; Columbia Law School
- Occupations: Lawyer, banker, real estate developer
- Spouse: Margaret Merritt (m. 1903; died 1943)
- Children: 3, including Janet
- Relatives: Bouvier-Lee family

James Thomas Lee (October 2, 1877 – January 3, 1968) was an American lawyer, banker, and real estate investor. He was the maternal grandfather of former First Lady Jacqueline Kennedy and Princess Lee Radziwill.

== Early life ==
Lee was born in Manhattan on October 2, 1877. He was the only surviving son and eldest of ten children, six of whom lived to adulthood. His father being born and raised in Newark, New Jersey to parents from County Cork and his mother was born to parents from County Tipperary and raised by her uncle in Troy, New York after being orphaned at a young age. He met his wife when they were both teaching in Troy. His father received his M.D. at Bellevue College in 1880 and became a doctor and later, district superintendent of New York City Public Schools.

In 1898, after a year spent studying violin, Lee enrolled in the City College of New York to study engineering. In two years, he had joined Delta Kappa Epsilon and was working as a law clerk earning $6-a-week. In 1901, he graduated from City College and then enrolled in a master's program at Columbia University in political science and economics. He graduated with an A.M. degree in 1902 and then began law school, graduating from Columbia Law School in 1903.

== Career ==
After graduating law school and serving as a clerk, Lee then opened his own law practice. Aware of the impending construction of the Seventh Avenue Subway, he began buying property along the proposed route which tripled in value after the Subway became a fact. By 1910, his career was focused primarily on real estate development, and was eventually responsible for building more than two hundred residential and commercial buildings. His company, of which he was president, was the real-estate focused Shelton Holding Corporation.

By 1908, Lee and his partner, Charles R. Fleischmann, built the 12-story Peter Stuyvesant apartments at the corner of 98th and Riverside Drive, designed by William L. Rouse.

In 1910, while living at 669 West End Avenue near 93rd Street, he built 998 Fifth Avenue, another luxury cooperative that was designed by the McKim, Mead & White architectural firm and was across the street from the Metropolitan Museum of Art.

Between 1913 and 1920, he built a series of office buildings near Grand Central Terminal, the Central Building on 45th Street, the Berkeley Building on 44th Street and the National Association Building on 43rd Street, all designed by Starrett & van Vleck. In 1923, he built the Shelton Hotel (today the New York Marriott East Side) at 49th Street and Lexington Avenue, designed by Arthur Loomis Harmon, which at the time was the tallest hotel in the world at 24 stories.

In 1928, he was elected to the board of the Chase National Bank and stayed with them until 1943 when he began serving as president and chairman of the board of the Central Savings Bank.

In 1929, he began building 740 Park Avenue, a luxury cooperative apartment building on Park Avenue between East 71st and 72nd Streets designed by Rosario Candela and Arthur Loomis Harmon of Manhattan, New York City, which has been described as "the most luxurious and powerful residential building in New York City".

== Personal life ==
On October 7, 1903, Lee was married to teacher Margaret Ann Merritt (1880–1943), who had been born in New York City to Irish immigrants from County Clare, Thomas Merritt and Maria, née Curry. Together, they were the parents of:

- Marion Merritt Lee (1906–1947), who married John Joseph Ryan Jr. (1904–1963), a partner at Bache & Co., in 1927 and had issue, including Mary Cecil, married to English-American businessman and heir William Amherst Vanderbilt Cecil.
- Janet Norton Lee (1907–1989), who married John Vernou Bouvier III (1891–1957) in 1928. They divorced in 1940 and she remarried to Hugh Dudley Auchincloss (1897–1976) in 1942. After his death, she married Bingham Willing Morris (1906–1996) in 1979.
- Margaret Winifred Lee (1912–1991), who married Franklin D'Olier Jr. (1911–2000), a son of Franklin D'Olier and uncle to F. D. Reeve, in 1936.

Lee joined East Hampton's Maidstone Club in 1925.

His wife died unexpectedly, at age 63, at their daughter Marion's home in Hewlett Bay Park in February 1943. She and her husband had been estranged for many years, but remained married. Lee died at his home, 580 Park Avenue in Manhattan, on January 3, 1968. After a funeral at the Church of St. Vincent Ferrer in Manhattan, he was buried alongside his parents at Gate of Heaven Cemetery in Hawthorne, NY.

=== Descendants ===
Through his eldest daughter, Marion, he was the grandfather of two girls, Joan Ryan (1929–1997), and Mary Lee Ryan (1931–2017), the wife of William Amherst Vanderbilt Cecil, owner of Biltmore. He also had two grandsons through his daughter Marion. Through his daughter Janet, he was the grandfather of three girls, First Lady of the United States Jacqueline Lee Bouvier (1929–1994), the wife of John F. Kennedy, and Aristotle Onassis; Caroline Lee Bouvier (1933–2019), the wife of Michael Temple Canfield, Prince Stanisław Albrecht Radziwiłł, Herbert Ross; and Janet Jennings Auchincloss (1945–1985), who married Lewis Polk Rutherfurd. He had one grandson through daughter Janet, named James Lee Auchincloss. Through his daughter Margaret Winifred, he was the grandfather of Anne C. d'Olier and Winifred Lee d'Olier, who married prominent investment banker Anthony Coats Brown in 1962.
