= Lewis Rutherfurd =

Lewis Rutherfurd may refer to:

- Lewis Morris Rutherfurd (1816–1892), American lawyer and astronomer
- Lewis Morris Rutherfurd Jr. (1859–1901), American socialite and sportsman
- Lewis Polk Rutherfurd (born c. 1944), American-born financier in Hong Kong
