= Van Cortlandt Park–242nd Street station =

New York City Subway terminal station in the Bronx

Van Cortlandt Park–242 Street
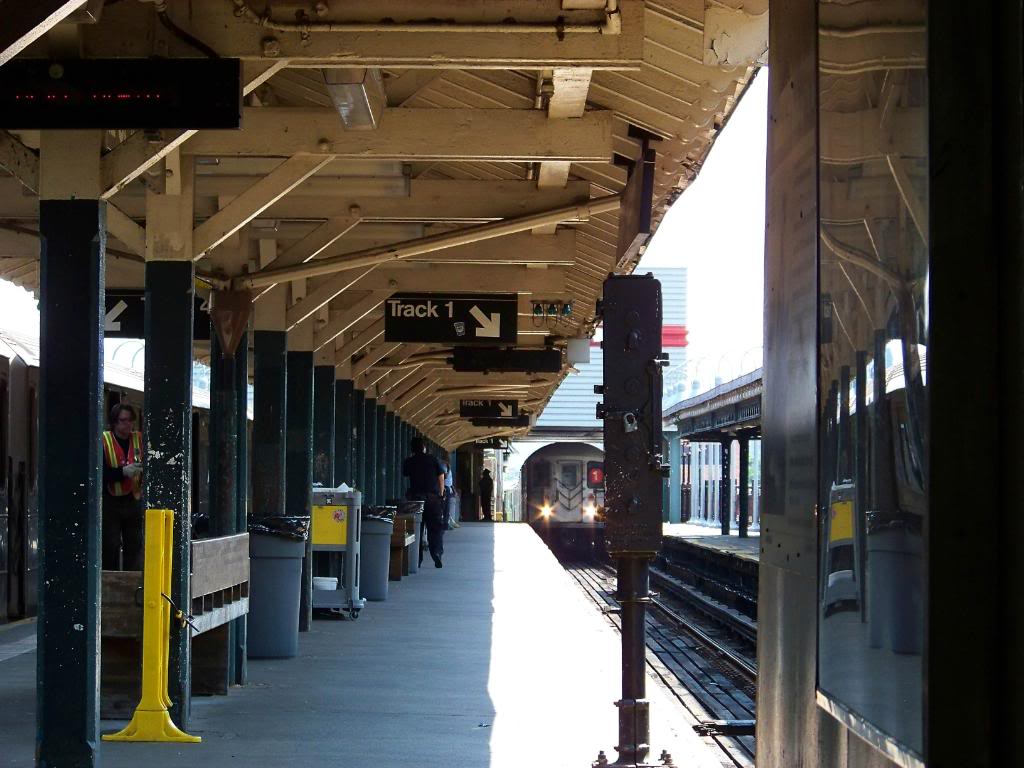
- Looking south from the north end of the tracks, a 1 train enters Track 1. Another 1 train sits at Track 4.

Station statistics
- Address: West 242nd Street & Broadway; Bronx, New York
- Borough: The Bronx
- Locale: Fieldston, Kingsbridge, Riverdale
- Coordinates: 40.889222°N 73.898583°W
- Division: A (IRT)
- Line: IRT Broadway–Seventh Avenue Line
- Services: 1 (all times)
- Transit: NYCT Bus: Bx9; MTA Bus: BxM3; Bee-Line Bus: 1, 2, 3
- Structure: Elevated
- Platforms: 1 island platform (in service); 2 side platforms (unused); Spanish solution
- Tracks: 2

Other information
- Opened: August 1, 1908; 118 years ago
- Accessible: No; under construction
- Former/other names: 242 St–Van Cortlandt Park (Note: Used on platform signs and most R62A destination rollsigns)

Traffic
- 2025: 1,316,535 ▼4.9%
- Rank: 258 out of 423
Services
Preceding station	New York City Subway	Following station
Terminus	Local	238th Street toward South Ferry
Non-revenue services and lines
Preceding station	New York City Subway	Following station
Terminus	no service	Dyckman Street express
Location
Location within New York City Subway
Location within New York City
Location within New York
Track layout
Street map
Station service legend
Symbol	Description
Stops all times	Stops all times
- 242nd Street - Van Cortlandt Park Station (IRT)
- U.S. National Register of Historic Places
- Architect: Heins & LaFarge
- Architectural style: Victorian Gothic
- MPS: New York City Subway System MPS
- NRHP reference No.: 05000226
- Added to NRHP: March 30, 2003

The Van Cortlandt Park–242nd Street station is the northern terminal station of the New York City Subway's IRT Broadway–Seventh Avenue Line. Located at the intersection of 242nd Street and Broadway (US Route 9) on the border of Fieldston and Kingsbridge in the Bronx, it is served by the 1 train at all times. It is adjacent to Van Cortlandt Park to the east, Manhattan University, and the 240th Street Yard of the subway system, along with the affluent neighborhoods of Fieldston and Riverdale to the west.

It was built from a design by subway architects Heins & LaFarge. Today it is the only remaining Victorian Gothic elevated terminal station on the subway, and contains the subway's only remaining scrolled station sign among its decorative flourishes. In 2005, it was listed on the National Register of Historic Places.

== History ==
=== Construction and opening ===
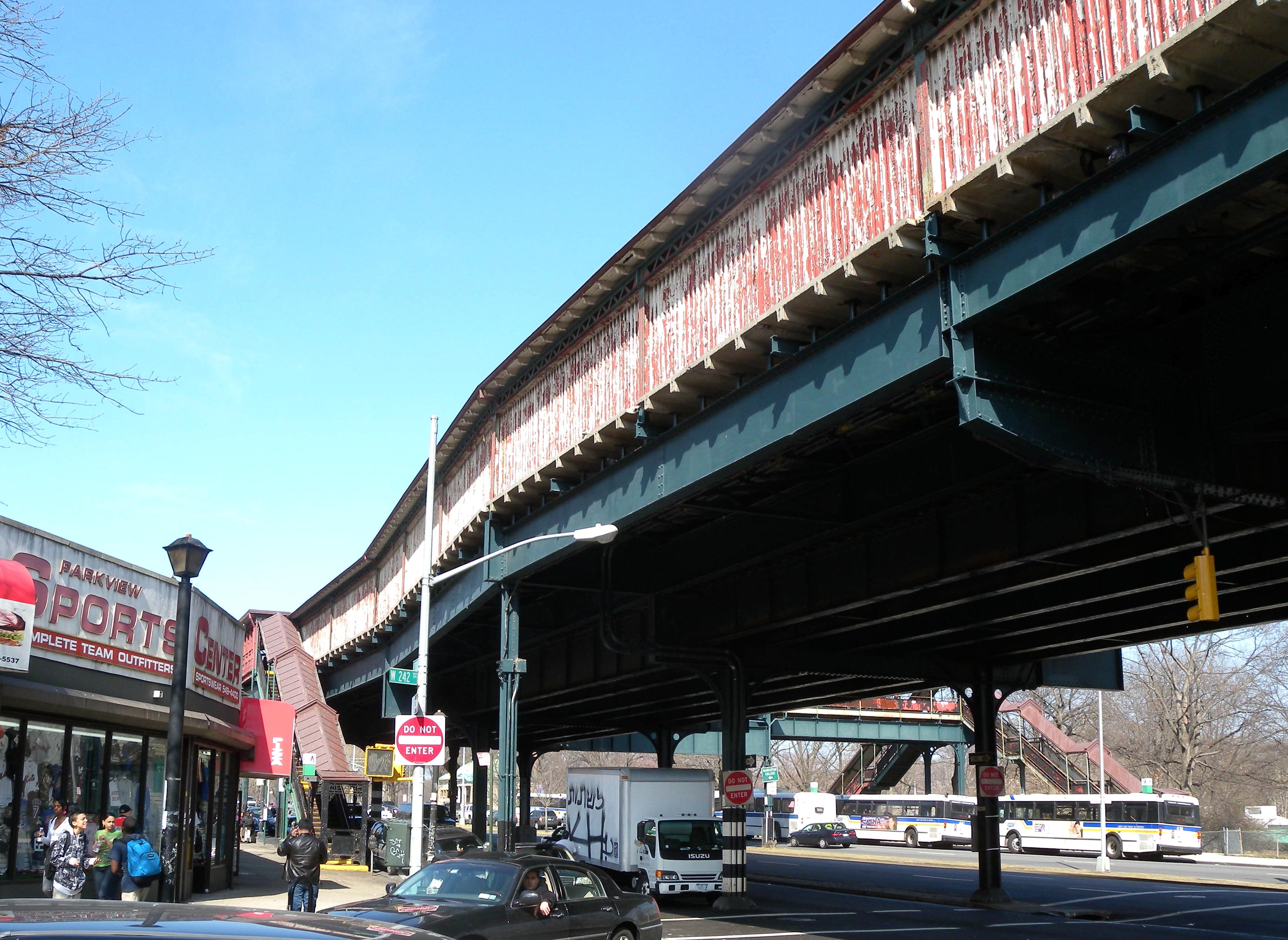
West side of the station, with white windscreens; the station exit is visible in the background

The station was built as part of the Contract 1 system erected from 1904–1908, connecting Lower Manhattan to the Bronx. Originally the northern terminus was intended to be Bailey Avenue and 230th Street, a block southeast of the current station at 231st Street. After the completion of the Harlem River Ship Canal at the end of the 19th century, the line was rerouted to a new terminus at 242nd Street. Like many of the other terminal stations in the outer boroughs, it was located near a park.

Heins & LaFarge, who had already designed the Cathedral of St. John the Divine near Columbia University and the Astor Court at the Bronx Zoo, were commissioned to design the stations. In the early 1890s, the city's transit commissioners had recommended that subway stations be painted and decorated in order to make the experience of using the system pleasant. They took further inspiration from the contemporary City Beautiful movement, which called for beautiful public architecture in the hope that it would inspire citizens to act virtuously.

Their use of the Victorian Gothic architectural style reflected its popularity at that time for train stations. The six elevated stations they built in that style on the Contract 1 are extensively decorated on their exterior surfaces, complementing the corresponding tilework and mosaics in the underground stations. 242nd Street, which opened on August 1, 1908, is the only elevated terminal station left in that style from Contract 1.

Within a few years of the station's opening, ridership on the line north of 157th Street increased sharply. In 1913, 3.1 million tickets were sold at the Van Cortlandt Park station. Undeveloped lots along Broadway to the city's northern limit were quickly bought by builders hoping to profit from the boom in luxury houses, which could reach the subway through streetcar lines as well. At that time, it was expected that the line would be extended to 262nd Street. The Horace Mann School was built to serve this population.

=== Later years ===
To address overcrowding, in 1909, the New York Public Service Commission proposed lengthening the platforms at stations along the original IRT subway. As part of a modification to the IRT's construction contracts made on January 18, 1910, the company was to lengthen station platforms to accommodate ten-car express and six-car local trains. In addition to $1.5 million (equivalent to $51.8 million in 2025) spent on platform lengthening, $500,000 (equivalent to $17.3 million in 2025) was spent on building additional entrances and exits. It was anticipated that these improvements would increase capacity by 25 percent. The side platforms at the 242nd Street station were extended 62 feet (19 m) to the south. Six-car local trains began operating in October 1910, and ten-car express trains began running on the West Side Line on January 24, 1911.

In 1947, Jack Kerouac passed through the station, then a busy trolley hub, at the end of the first leg of his escape from the city in what became On the Road. His goal was to reach U.S. Route 6 at the Bear Mountain Bridge and use it as a route along which to go west to Denver. The attempt failed when he found very little traffic on Route 6 to hitch rides from, and he returned to the city to take a bus instead.

The city government took over the IRT's operations on June 12, 1940. The IRT routes were given numbered designations in 1948 with the introduction of "R-type" rolling stock, which contained rollsigns with numbered designations for each service. The route to 242nd Street became known as the 1. In 1959, all 1 trains became local.

In 2019, the Metropolitan Transportation Authority announced that this station would become ADA-accessible as part of the agency's 2020–2024 Capital Program.

A request for proposals was put out on May 18, 2023 for the contract for a project bundle to make 13 stations accessible, including 242nd Street. A contract for one elevator at the station was awarded in December 2023. Construction on the elevator was begun in late September 2024, and is anticipated to be completed and opened in 2026.

== Station layout ==
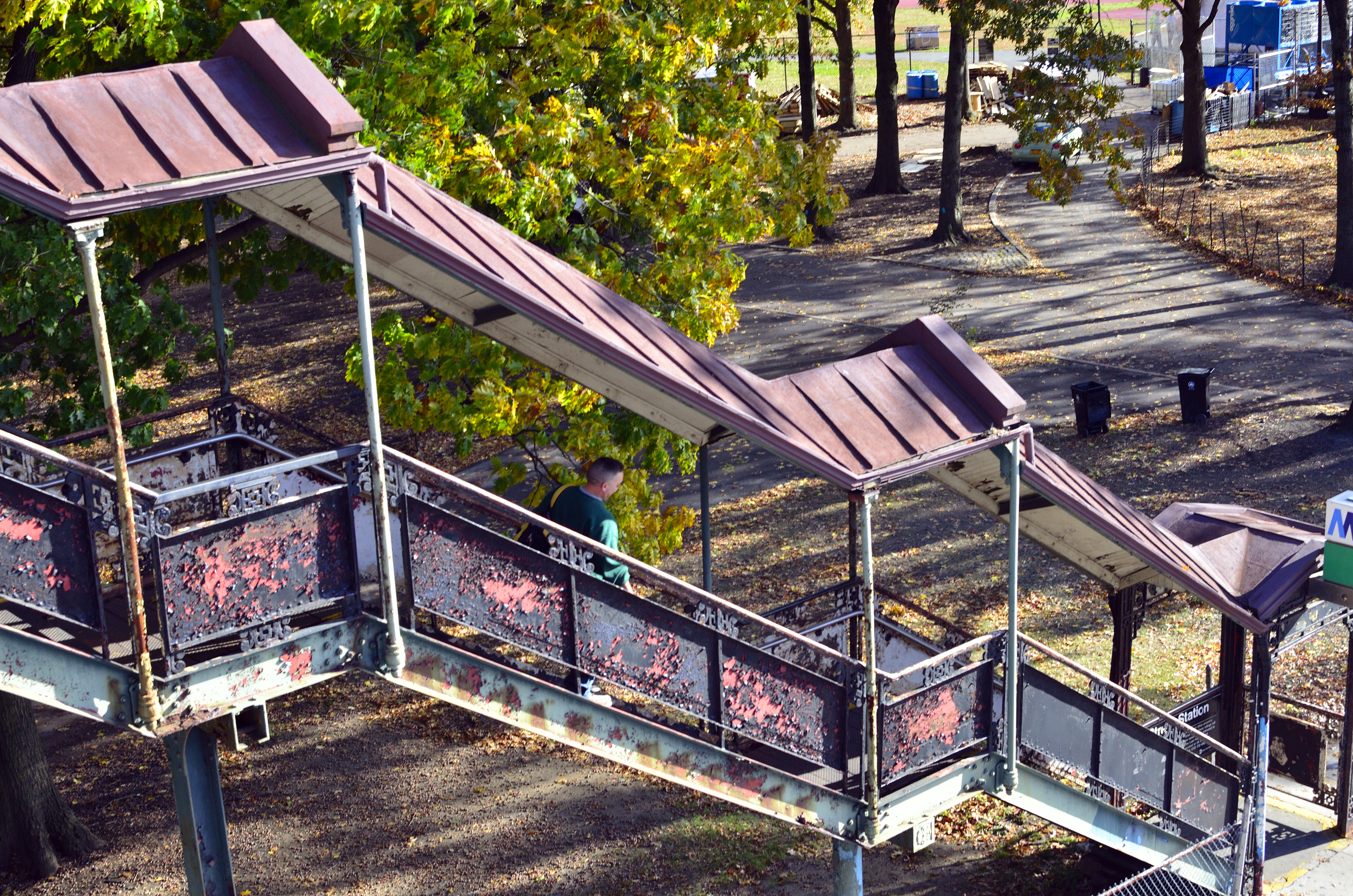
Street stair

The station is served by the 1 at all times and is its northern terminus; the next stop to the south is 238th Street. There are three components to the station: the platforms, a control house perpendicular to the tracks at the north end, and a crew quarters building spanning the platform at the south end. From the northeast corner an overpass crosses the through-traffic lanes of Broadway. Two stairs descend in either direction from its end, matching the two stairs that descend to the sidewalk from the west of the control house.

Just south of the station, the line widens to three tracks, which is the configuration up to just before Dyckman Street.

=== Location ===
The station is located 29 feet (8.8 m) above the west side of the street, where parking is located on either side of where West 242nd Street intersects from the west. On that side of the street are commercial buildings, including a large parking garage on the southwest corner; the east side has the track, football field, tennis courts, swimming pools and other athletic facilities of Van Cortlandt Park. Also in the park nearby, to the northeast, is the Van Cortlandt House Museum, a National Historic Landmark. The 240th Street Yard is beyond the parking garage to the southwest, next to the campus of Manhattan University, a few blocks west of the station.

=== Platforms ===
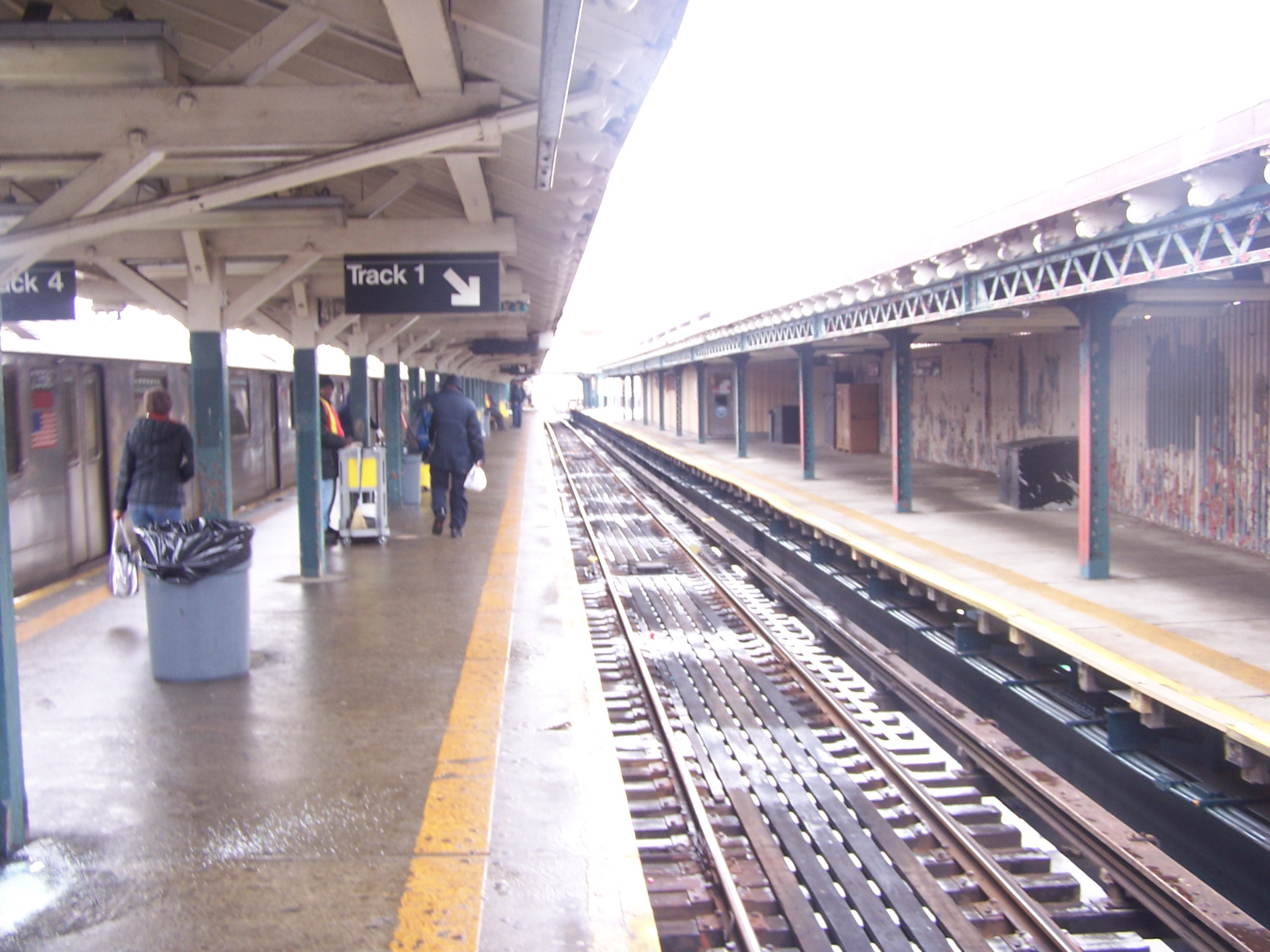
Track 1, with the island platform on the left and a side platform on the right

There is one island platform and two side platforms. The station was formerly set up as a Spanish solution with alighting passengers using the side platforms and boarding passengers using the island platform. Now, only the center island platform is open to the public for boarding and disembarking from trains. They are floored in concrete and sheltered with a wooden roof covered in standing-seam metal supported by trussed steel T-frames on the side platforms and timber in the center. Rounded rafter tails project from the eaves. The sides, except for the open southernmost section, have had metal windscreen added.

Under the canopies are modern fluorescent lights. On the eastern platform, the original iron railings support original lights, with dish-shaped downlights on a curved stem. At the south end is the only scrolled station sign remaining anywhere in the subway system. The western platform has its original railing and modern lights.

=== Control house ===
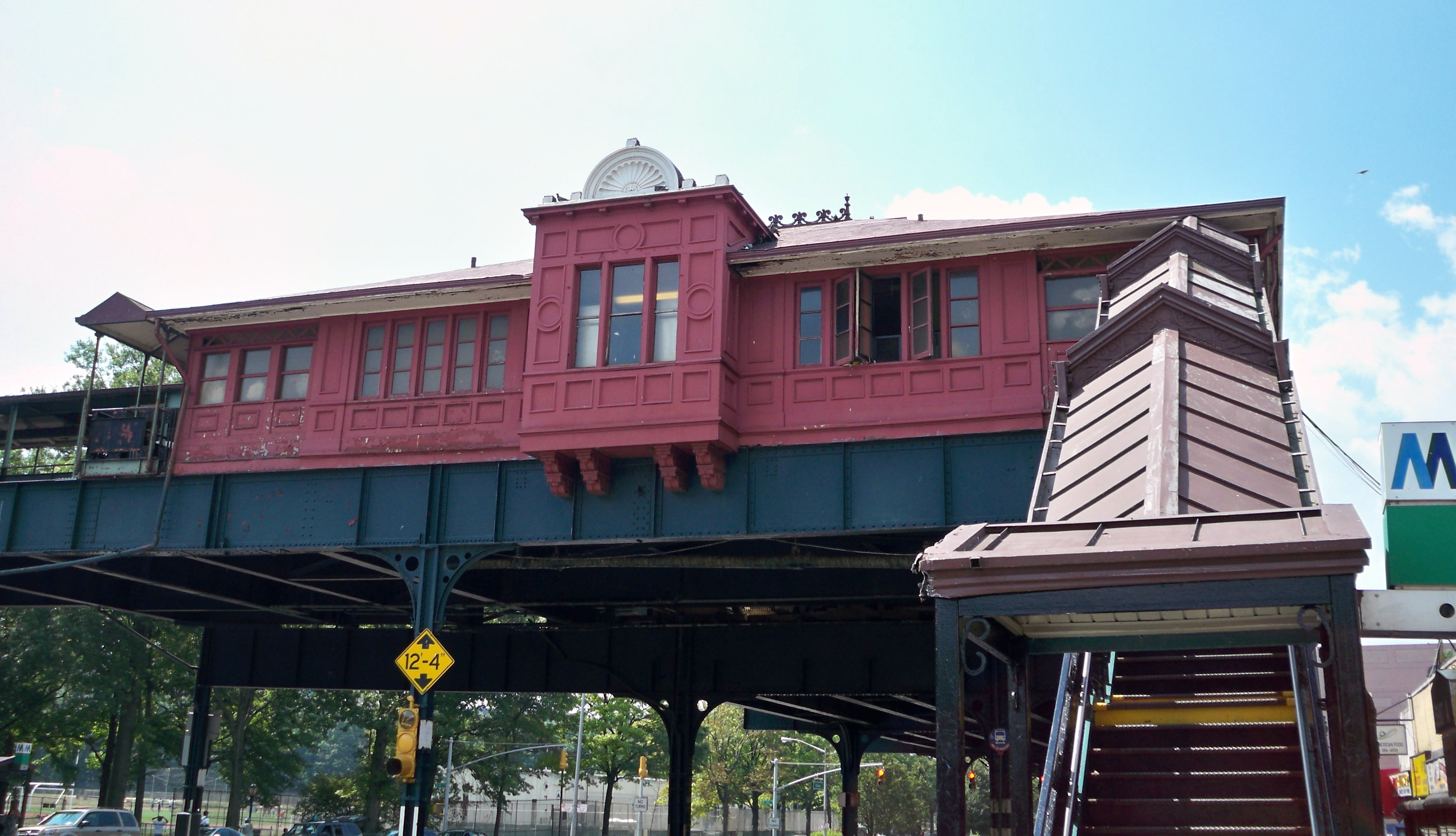
Control house

The control house is the dominant architectural feature of the station. The copper-clad timber frame exterior is painted in a vertical, batten seam pattern. It is topped with a low hipped roof clad in sheet metal and pierced by two ventilating dormer windows on the east and west side. A fleur-de-lis–patterned group of finials at the peak.

On the north facade, narrow casement windows are echoed by recessed panels below. The groups of five in the section on either side of the projecting central bay window are flanked by blind openings. The bay is supported by corbeled brackets and topped with a fan gable above the overhanging eaves at the roofline. Its tripartite narrow windows are surrounded by recessed panels with inset circles on the sides and above.

At both sides are steel frame parapets with wooden decks. These connect the western stairs and overpass to the control house. The stairs combine structural steel and decorative cast iron. Their supports are braced steel Tuscan columns. Gabled standing-seam metal canopies with box fluorescent lighting over the stairs are on narrow supports with slightly fluted capitals. At street level are gabled entries whose support columns are decorated with a geometric pattern similar to that on the control house's projecting bay window. C-shaped brackets support the original signage, now painted over.

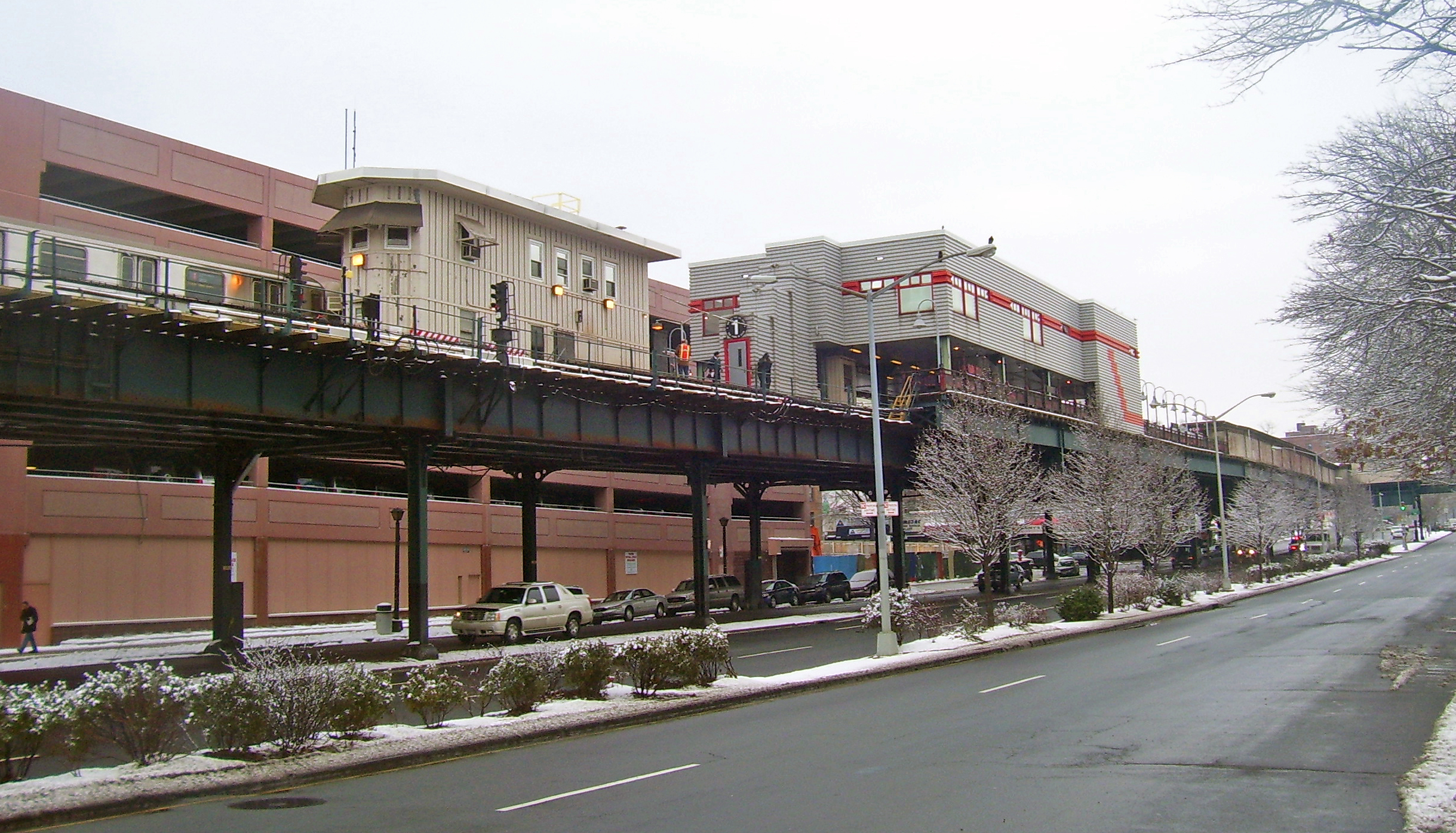
Old signal building and crew quarters

The steel-framed overpass is an architecturally sympathetic addition. Railings are a more restrained version of the original railings found on the platform. It is floored in wood plank and roofed with slats covered by standing seam metal. At its west end is a covered veranda leading into the control house.

On the inside, the control house is floored in wood plank as well. The walls are finished in a mix of solid and tongue and groove wood paneling. Tall riveted steel arches support the ceiling. The main waiting area has niches where modern heaters have replaced the original pot-bellied stoves. There is a modern steel and glass token booth and turnstile bank, along with OMNY vending machines. Former restrooms have been converted into utility and storage rooms.

=== Crew quarters ===
The crew quarters building is located at the south end of the platforms. It is a one-story building sided in corrugated metal with a flat roof, elevated over the tracks and platforms at that end. The siding has been given the appearance of clapboard and painted gray. A belt course corresponding to the top of the windows has been painted red, the color of the Broadway–Seventh Avenue trunk line, on both side elevations; it is augmented with a series of blocks in the same color descending towards the tracks on the north end.

At the south end, a series of projecting nested bays descends to an entrance to track level. To its south is an old signal house also sided in metal. The crew quarters can also be entered from the center platform. Its interior is given over to employee-related functions and is not open to the public.

=== Exits ===
At the north end of the station, past fare control, there are four stairs that lead down to Broadway. Two go to the west side of Broadway, and two go to the east side.

== See also ==
- List of New York City Subway terminals
- National Register of Historic Places listings in Bronx County, New York
