= Lasata =

Estate in East Hampton, New York, United States

Coordinates: 40.959130°N 72.169348°W

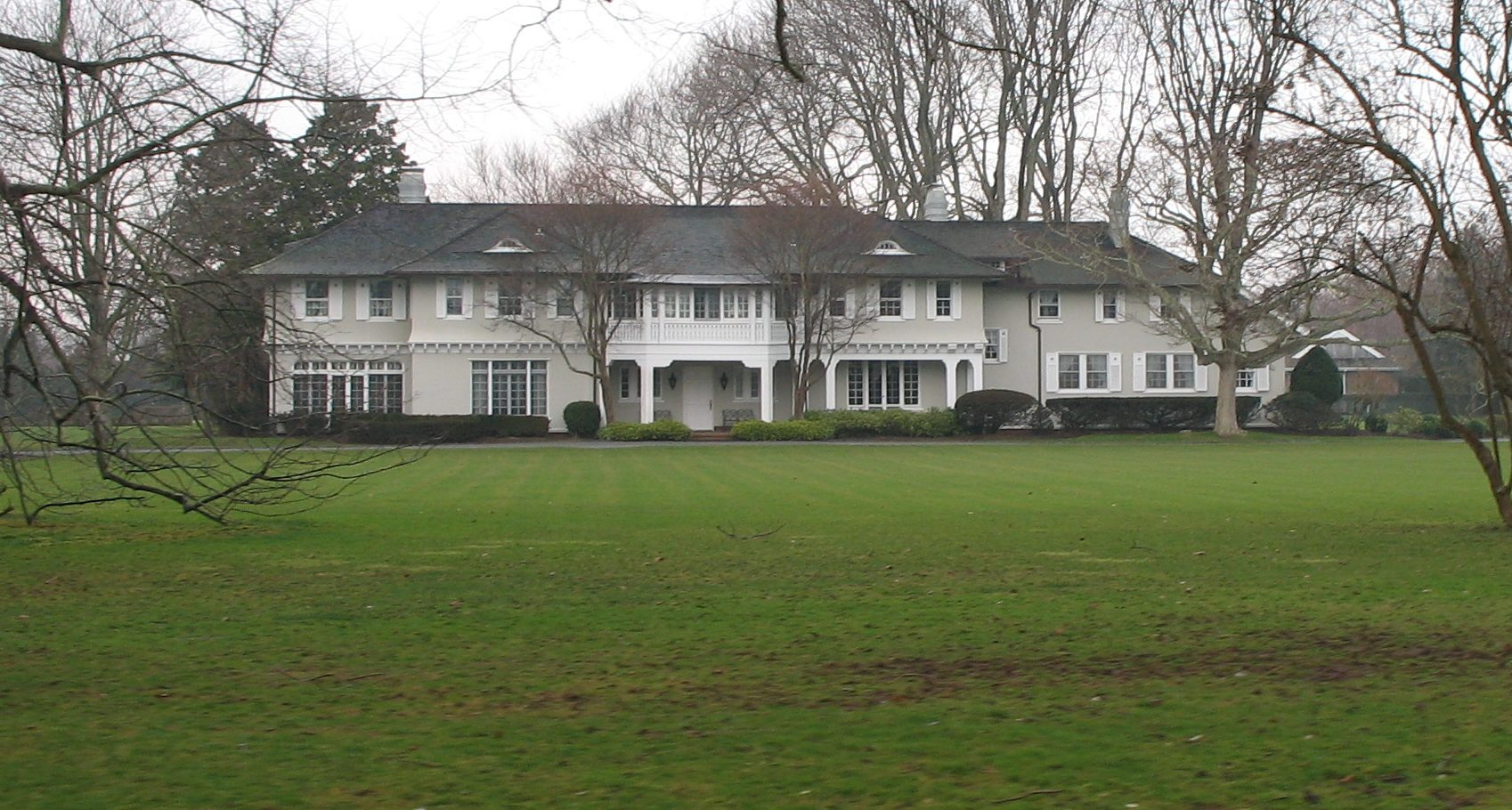
Lasata in 2007

Lasata is an estate in East Hampton, New York, United States, designed by New York architect Arthur C. Jackson.

It was the childhood summer home of future First Lady of the United States Jacqueline Kennedy Onassis until she was about age twelve.

== Description ==
Location of the mansion

The two-story, gray-stucco mansion (also known as the George Schurman house) at 121 Further Lane was built in 1917 on 12 acres (4.9 ha), two blocks from the Atlantic Ocean and three blocks from the Maidstone Club.

Included on the grounds was a stable for 8 acres (3.2 ha), tack room, jumping ring and paddock, extensive vegetable gardens, a grape arbor and Maude Bouvier's "Italian garden," edged with boxwood and dotted with classical statues.

== History ==
The house belonged to Jacqueline Kennedy Onassis's paternal grandparents, John Vernou Bouvier Jr. (referred to as "the Major") and Maude Sergeant Bouvier. The Bouviers' first summer residence in East Hampton was a simple house called Wildmoor, on Apaquogue Road in the Georgica neighborhood, which the Major bought about 1910. In 1925, the Major's wife, Maude Sergeant bought the house. The Major bought the house from his wife in 1935 after inheriting money from his uncle Michel Charles "M. C." Bouvier. The Bouviers said "Lasata" was a Native American name for "place of peace."

Jackie's father, John Vernou Bouvier III, married Janet Norton Lee at St. Philomena's Catholic Church (later called Most Holy Trinity Catholic Church) in East Hampton on July 7, 1928. They stayed at Lasata and also rented nearby. Jackie was born on July 28, 1929, at Southampton Hospital in Southampton, New York.

Jackie was to be an accomplished horse rider during her stays at Lasata and her favorite horse was Danceuse. The New York Times wrote in 1940 following a competition at Madison Square Garden:

Jacqueline Bouvier, an eleven-year-old equestrienne from East Hampton, Long Island, scored a double victory in the horsemanship competition. Miss Bouvier achieved a rare distinction. The occasions are few when a young rider wins both contests in the same show.

At age ten, Jackie wrote, of her time at Lasata:

When I go down to the sandy shore
I can think of nothing I want more
Than to live by the booming blue sea
As the seagulls flutter around about me
I can run about when the tide is out
With the wind and the sea all about
And the seagulls are swirling and diving for fish
Oh-to live by the sea is my only wish

John Vernou Bouvier Jr. died in 1948. The family sold the house in 1950.

== Later ownership ==
In 2006, the property was offered for sale for $25 million. It was sold for $24 million in 2007 by the heirs of long-time owner Miriam Meehan; the purchaser was former Coach fashion designer and executive, Reed Krakoff, and his wife, Delphine.

The property was subdivided into one empty four-acre plot and another with seven acres and the house. Both plots sold in January 2018, with the Krakoffs selling the seven-acre parcel for $24 million to Hollywood producer David Zander.

In August 2023, fashion designer and filmmaker Tom Ford bought the estate for $52 million.
