= Arthur C. Jackson =

American architect (1866–1941)

Arthur Cornelius Jackson (September 19, 1866 – April 7, 1941) was an American architect, based in New York City. He is best known today as the architect of Lasata, the childhood summer home in East Hampton, New York of a future First Lady of the United States Jacqueline Kennedy Onassis.

== Early life ==
Jackson was born in Utica, New York on September 19, 1866. He was the son of William Bennett Jackson (1820–1890) and Elizabeth Blake Jackson (1824–1874). His sister, Angeline Sherwood Jackson, married Alvin W. Krech, chairman of the board of the Equitable Trust Company who was also Treasurer of the Century Opera Company.

He was educated at Utica Free Academy before attending Harvard University, where he received a Bachelor of Arts degree in 1888. He then went to Paris, studied in the Atelier Durer, before graduating from the École des Beaux-Arts.

== Career ==
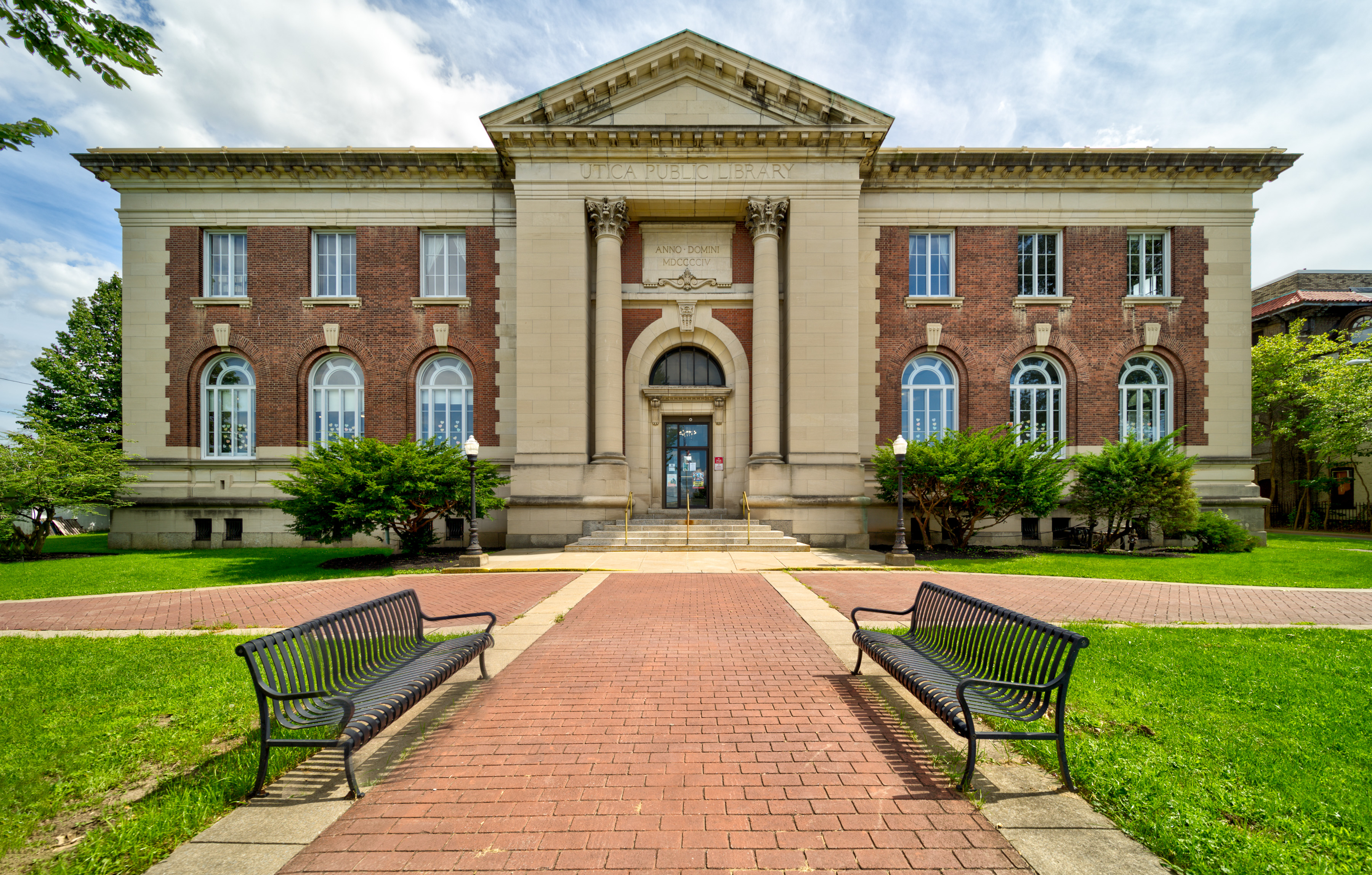
Utica Public Library, designed by Jackson while he was at Carrère and Hastings

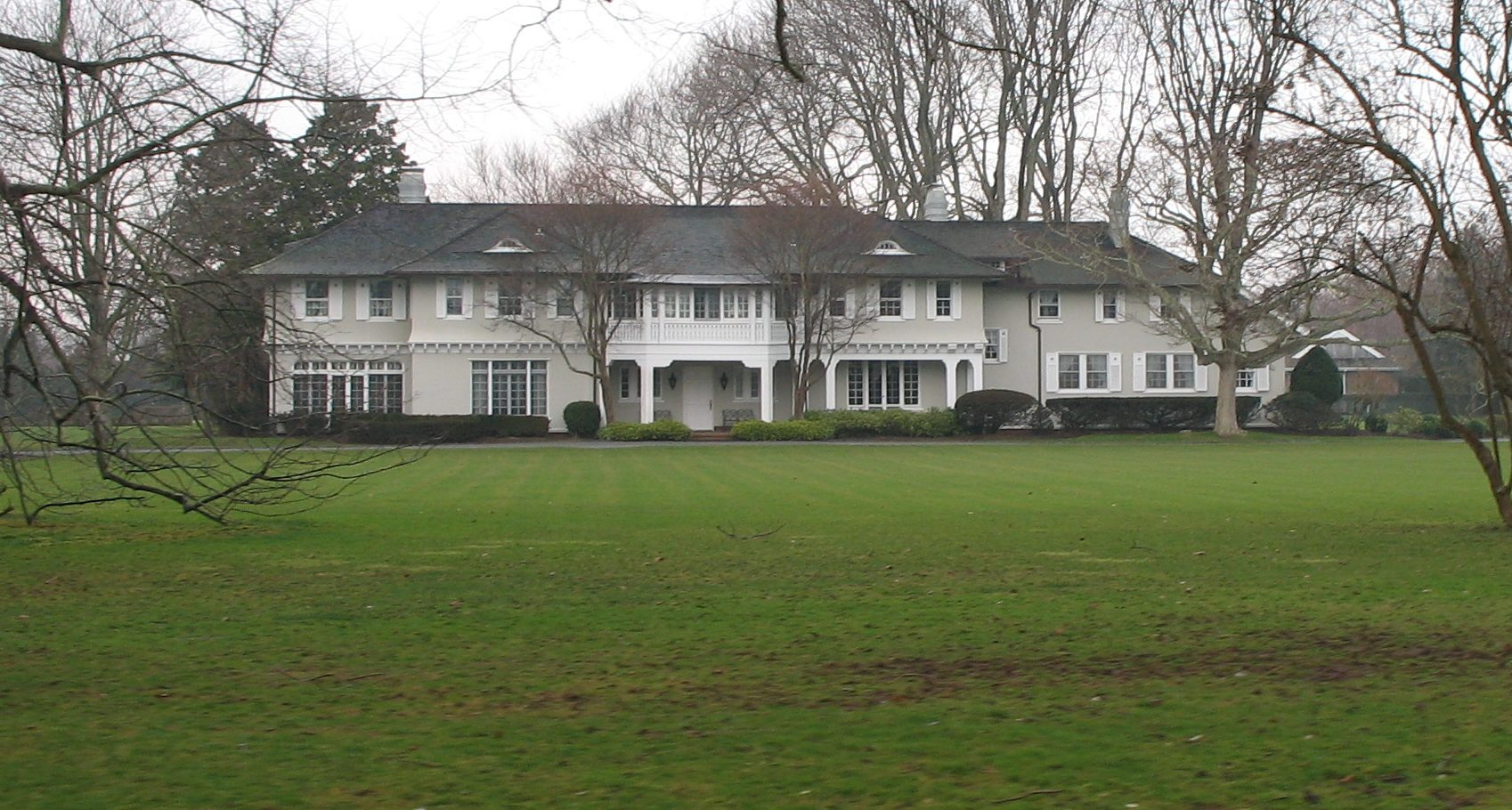
Lasata in 2007

From 1898 to 1907, he was employed by the firm of Carrère and Hastings in New York and performed important work in preparing the successful entry for the design of the New York Public Library. He also designed the Utica Public Library in his hometown of Utica, New York.

He became a member of the American Institute of Architects in 1907. Between 1909 and 1911, he worked in the office of LaFarge & Morris. He had worked with Benjamin Wistar Morris at Carrère and Hastings on the designs for the New York Public Library. Christopher Grant LaFarge, the eldest son of artist John La Farge, had previously been a partner of George Lewis Heins in Heins & LaFarge until Heins' death in 1907. In 1911, he started his own firm, "devoting himself principally to the design of city and country private homes". His office was at 501 Fifth Avenue.

In 1917, he designed Lasata in East Hampton, New York for George W. Schurman and his wife, Helen (née Munro) Schurman. The home was later owned by John Vernou Bouvier Jr., Jacqueline Kennedy Onassis's grandfather.

=== Notable buildings ===
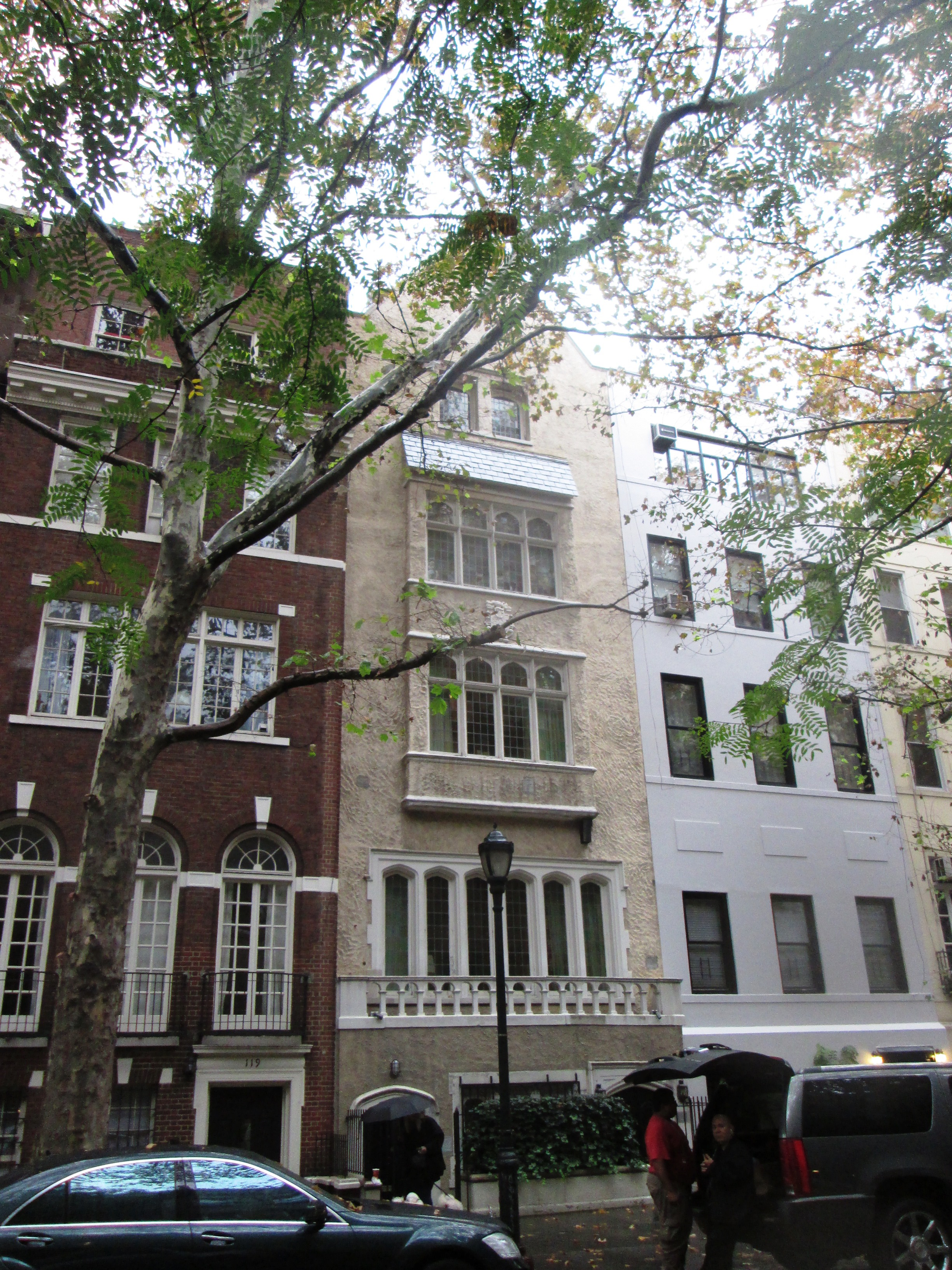
119 East 64th Street

- Utica Public Library, Utica, New York (1901)
- Alvin W. Krech Townhouse, 17 East 70th Street, New York City (1909)
- 11 East 89th Street, New York City (1912–3)
- Arthur Ryle House, 787 Park Avenue, New York City (1913)
- Dexter Blagden Townhouse, 41 East 51st Street, New York City (Note: The Blagden townhouse was located at 41 East 51st Street, but has since been torn down and replaced by the Blackrock headquarters.)
- Lawrence York Spear House, New London, Connecticut
- Henry E. Meeker Townhouse, 119 East 64th Street, New York City (1917). (Note: The house was originally built between 1876-77 with a neo-Grec facade designed by John McCool. Jackson replaced the facade with a neo-Federal in 1917 for Henry E. Meeker.)
- George W. Schurman House ("Lasata"), 121 Further Lane, East Hampton, New York (1917)
- National Surety Building, 4 Albany Street, New York City (1921) (Note: The National Surety Building, a small 130,000 sq. ft. neo-classical building at 4 Albany Street, was damaged and contaminated in the Collapse of the World Trade Center, and was demolished in 2005.)
- Dexter Blagden House, 713 Navesink River Road, Middletown Township, New Jersey (1927)
- Shepard Kretch House ("Briar Patch"), 100 Briarpatch Road, East Hampton, New York (1931)

== Personal life ==
He lived at 124 West 55th Street in Manhattan. He was interested in Polo and attended matches at the Meadowbrook Polo Club in Old Westbury, New York. A member of the University Club of New York, he served as Chairman of the Art Committee in 1917.

Jackson, who never married, died at Useppa Island, an island located near the northern end of Pine Island Sound in Lee County, Florida, in 1941. He was buried at the Forest Hill Cemetery in Utica. He was visiting at the home of Albert Rathbone (a former Assistant Secretary of the Treasury).
