= Frank Polk =

American diplomat (1871–1943)

Frank Lyon Polk
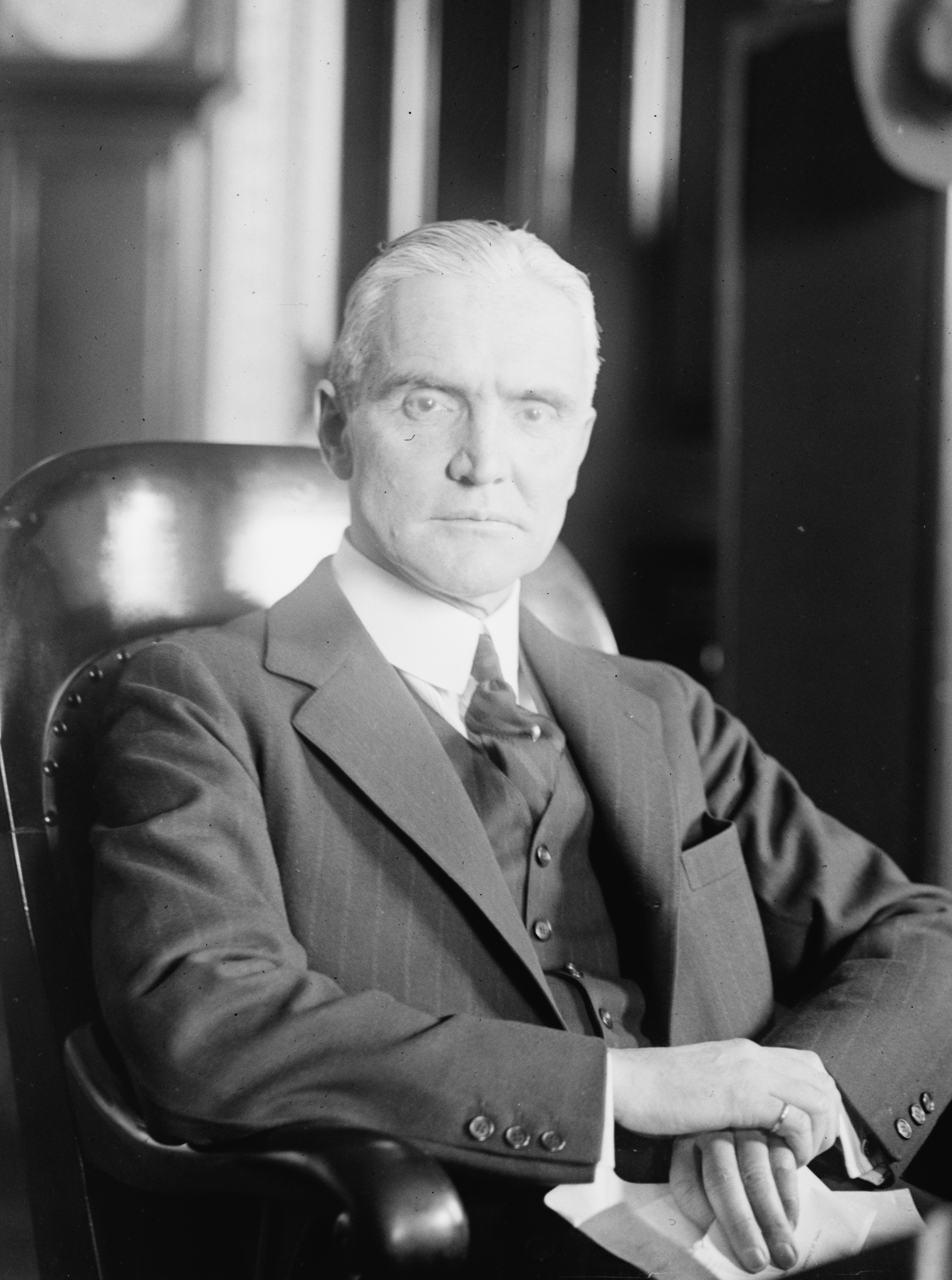
- Official portrait, 1920

1st United States Under Secretary of State
- In office July 1, 1919 – June 15, 1920
- President: Woodrow Wilson
- Preceded by: Office established
- Succeeded by: Norman Davis

Acting United States Secretary of State
- In office February 14, 1920 – March 12, 1920
- President: Woodrow Wilson
- Preceded by: Robert Lansing
- Succeeded by: Bainbridge Colby

4th Counselor of the United States Department of State
- In office September 16, 1915 – June 30, 1919
- President: Woodrow Wilson
- Preceded by: Robert Lansing
- Succeeded by: R. Walton Moore

Personal details
- Born: September 13, 1871 New York City, U.S.
- Died: February 7, 1943 (aged 71) New York City, U.S.
- Party: Democratic
- Spouse: Elizabeth Sturgis Potter
- Children: 5
- Education: Yale College (B.A.); Columbia Law School (LL.D.)

Frank Lyon Polk (September 13, 1871 – February 7, 1943) was an American lawyer and diplomat, who was also a name partner of the law firm today known as Davis Polk & Wardwell.

== Early life ==
Polk was born in New York City. He was the son of William Mecklenburg Polk, the dean of the Cornell Medical School, and the grandson of Bishop and Confederate General Leonidas Polk, who was a cousin of US President James Polk.

He graduated from Yale College in 1894 and Columbia University Law School in 1897. He was a member of the Scroll and Key Society.

== Career ==
In 1897, Polk began his law practice in New York City. He served on a variety of City boards and commissions. He was member of the civil service commission of New York from 1907 to 1909, and in 1907 and 1910 was a member of the New York City Board of Education. On January 24, 1914, New York City Mayor John Purroy Mitchel appointed him corporation counsel, which he remained until his appointment on September 16, 1915, as counselor for the US Department of State at Washington, DC, confirmed by the United States Senate on December 17, 1915. On April 17, 1914, Polk was wounded by gunfire when a former city employee attempted to assassinate Mitchel.

He served in the Department of State as Counselor until 1919, US Under Secretary of State in 1919 and 1920, and then as Acting US Secretary of State in 1920. Polk headed the American Commission to Negotiate Peace in 1919, and after President Woodrow Wilson's and Secretary Robert Lansing's departure from Paris in 1919, he represented the United States at the Paris peace conference. He also managed the 1924 Democratic presidential convention campaign of John W. Davis, another name partner of his law firm.

Polk served as president of the New York Public Library from April 13, 1932 until his death on February 7, 1943.

== Personal life ==
Polk was married to Elizabeth Sturgis Potter. Elizabeth was the daughter of James Potter, the Cunard Line representative in Philadelphia and former Philadelphia Phillies owner, and Elizabeth (Sturgis) Potter. The Polks lived at 6 East Sixty-eighth Street in New York City, had a home in Syosset on Long Island and in Boca Grande, Florida. Together, they had five children: John, Elizabeth, Frank, James, and Alice.

His portrait was painted by Sir Oswald Birley in 1923.

He was elected a member of the North Carolina Society of the Cincinnati in 1919. He was also a Grand Officer of the French Legion of Honor.

Frank Lyon Polk died on February 7, 1943, in New York City.

=== Descendants ===
Polk is the grandfather of financier Lewis Polk Rutherfurd. Rutherfurd was married to Janet Jennings Auchincloss, the half-sister of former First Lady Jacqueline Kennedy Onassis, from 1966 until her death in 1985.

Political offices
Preceded by Robert Lansing	Counselor of the United States Department of State; 1915–1919	Vacant Title next held by R. Walton Moore
Preceded by Office established	United States Under Secretary of State; 1919–1920	Succeeded by Norman Davis
Preceded by Robert Lansing	United States Secretary of State; Ad interim 1920	Succeeded by Bainbridge Colby
Non-profit organization positions
Preceded by Henry M. Waite	President of the National Municipal League; 1923 – 1927	Succeeded by Richard S. Childs
