= Utica Public Library =

- U.S. National Register of Historic Places
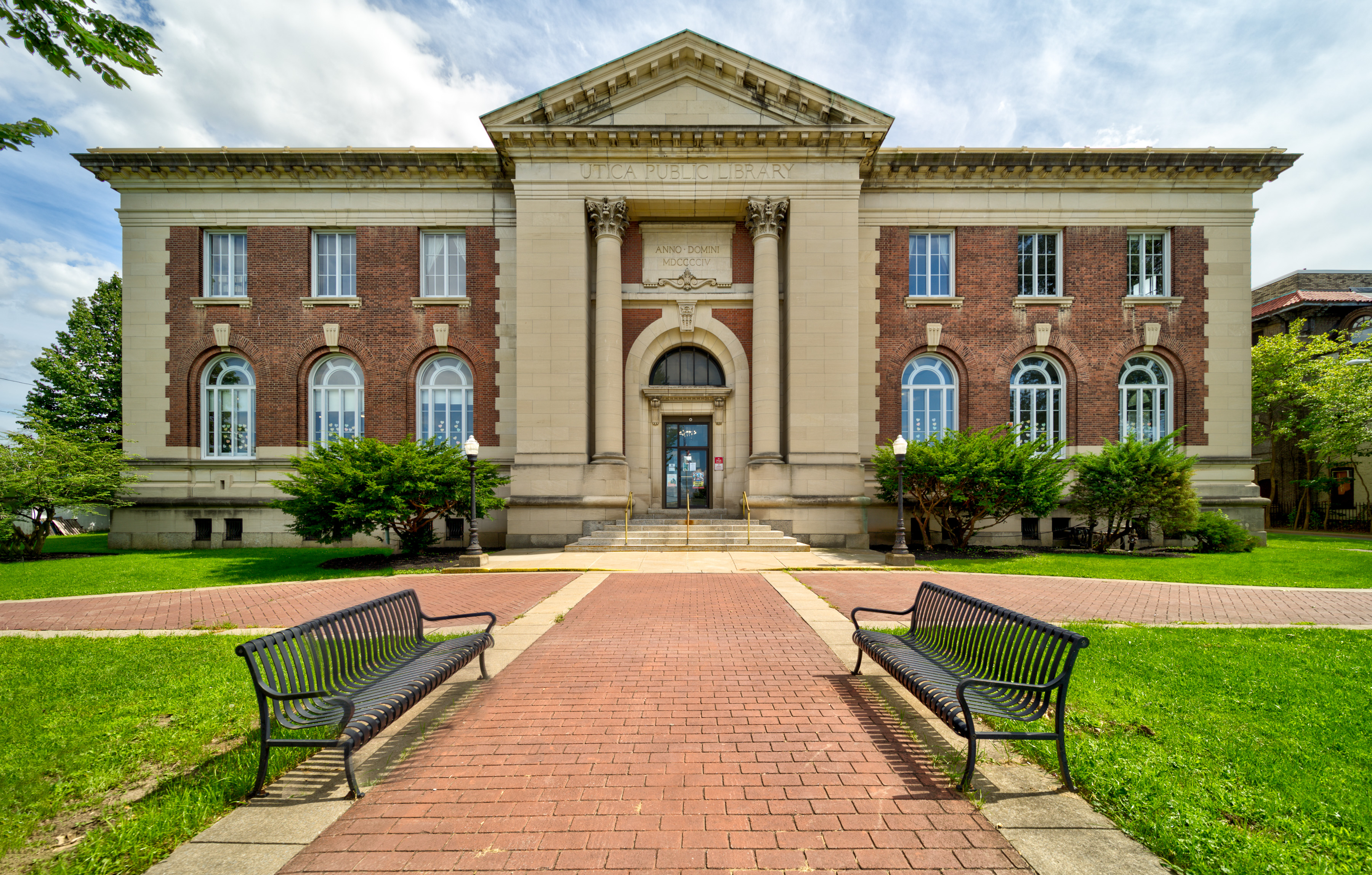
- Utica Public Library

- Location within New York Location within the United States
- Location: 303 Genesee St., Utica, New York
- Coordinates: 43°5′49″N 75°14′21″W
- Area: 1.5 acres (0.61 ha)
- Built: 1903
- Architect: Arthur C. Jackson
- Architectural style: Classical Revival, Second Empire
- Website: www.uticapubliclibrary.org
- NRHP reference No.: 82001210
- Added to NRHP: October 29, 1982

Utica Public Library is a historic library building located in Utica in Oneida County, New York. It is a rectangular five story Neoclassical style structure, constructed of New Haven brick on a limestone foundation. It features a central pedimented pavilion with Corinthian order columns.

== History ==
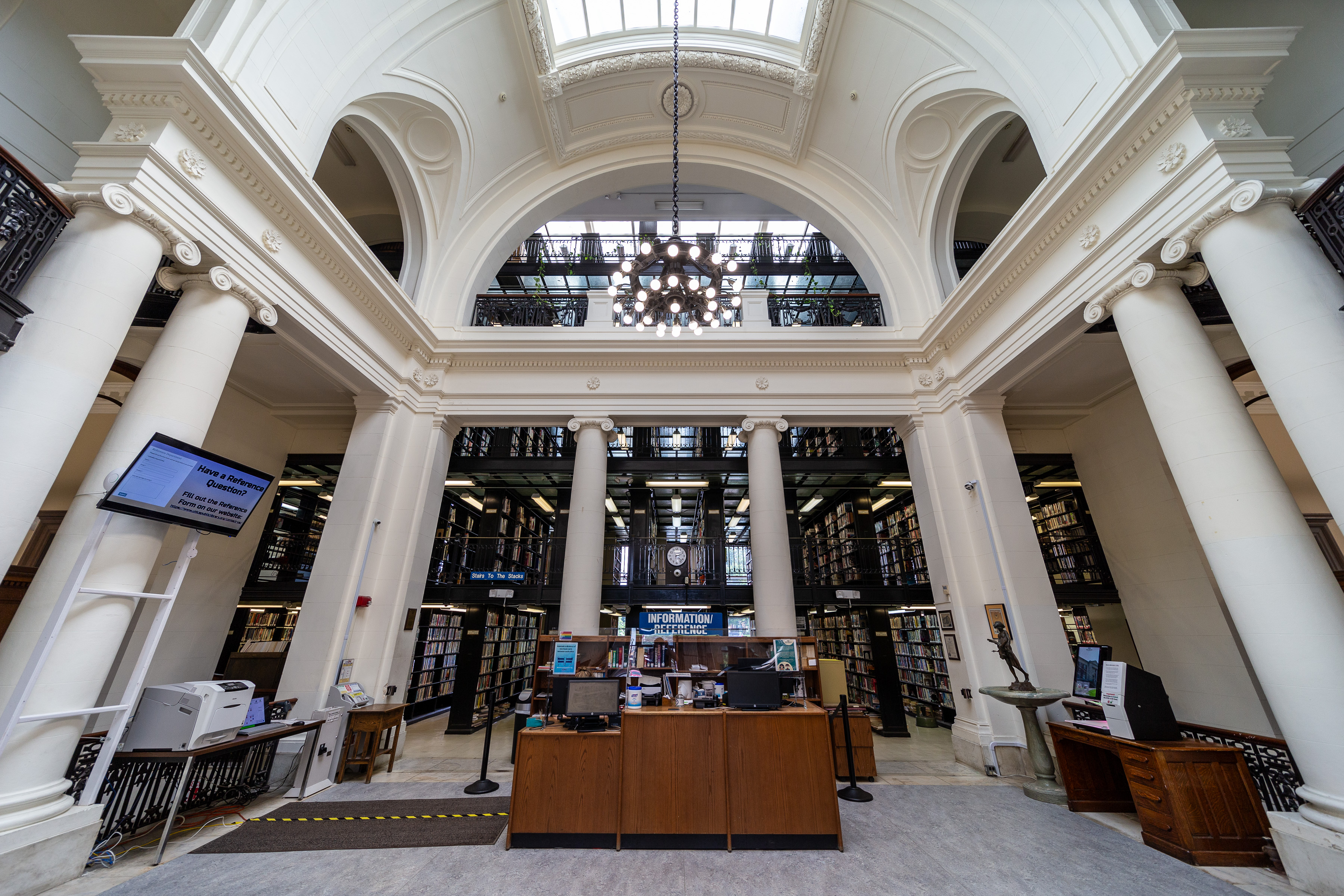
Interior

It was designed in 1901 by Utica native, architect Arthur C. Jackson of Carrère and Hastings of New York.

Originally the Utica Public Library sat at the Broad Street offices of Attorney Justus Rathbone in 1825. In 1842 the library had 1,700 volumes. It then reached 4,000 volumes in 1865. In 1904 more than 25,000 books from Elizabeth Street were transferred to the library.

When the Junior Museum of Oneida County was founded in 1963, it was housed in the basement of the Utica Public Library. It moved out in 1965.

It was listed on the National Register of Historic Places in 1982. In February 2004, the computer room was opened.
