= Janet Auchincloss Rutherfurd =

American socialite (1945–1985)

- Born: Janet Jennings Auchincloss; June 13, 1945; New York City, U.S.
- Died: March 13, 1985 (aged 39); Boston, Massachusetts, U.S.
- Burial place: Common Burying Ground and Island Cemetery
- Education: Potomac School; Miss Porter's School
- Alma mater: Sarah Lawrence College
- Spouse: Lewis Polk Rutherfurd (m. 1966)
- Children: 3
- Parent(s): Hugh D. Auchincloss Jr. Janet Lee Bouvier
- Relatives: Jacqueline Kennedy Onassis (half-sister); Lee Radziwill (half-sister); Nina Auchincloss Straight (half-sister); Caroline Kennedy (half-niece); John F. Kennedy Jr. (half-nephew)

Janet Jennings Auchincloss Rutherfurd (June 13, 1945 – March 13, 1985) was an American socialite. She was the half sister of the former First Lady of the United States, Jacqueline Kennedy Onassis, and socialite Princess Lee Radziwill.

== Early life ==
Auchincloss was born in New York City, the daughter of stockbroker Hugh D. Jr. and socialite Janet Auchincloss (née Lee). She was named after her mother (and was referred to as "Janet, Jr" by friends and family) while her middle name was in honor of her paternal grandmother, Emma Jennings. She had a younger brother, James Lee (known as "Jamie", born in 1947). In addition to elder half-sisters Jacqueline and Caroline (known as "Lee"), from her mother's first marriage to stockbroker John "Black Jack" Bouvier III, she had three elder half-siblings from her father's previous marriages: Hugh III (known as "Yusha", 1927–2015), Nina, and Thomas "Tommy" Auchincloss (born 1937). In the winter of 1945, Auchincloss was christened at the St. John Episcopal Church in The Plains, Virginia, and was raised in the faith.

She was educated at the Potomac School in McLean, Virginia, and Miss Porter's School in Farmington, Connecticut, the alma mater of her half-sisters Jacqueline and Lee. She went on to study music history at Sarah Lawrence College before leaving in 1966 to marry. Before meeting her future husband, Auchincloss briefly dated future Secretary of State John Kerry.

On August 17, 1963, Auchincloss was formally presented to society at a ball held at Hammersmith Farm, her childhood home in Newport, Rhode Island.

== Personal life ==
On July 30, 1966, she married Lewis Polk Rutherfurd, a recent graduate of Princeton University and future financier. Lewis was the son of Winthrop Rutherfurd Jr. of New York and Fishers Island, the grandson of Frank L. Polk, the Under Secretary of State in Woodrow Wilson's cabinet, and the great-grandson of Levi P. Morton, the former governor of New York and vice president under Benjamin Harrison. They had three children:

- Lewis Stuyvesant Rutherfurd
- Andrew Hugh Auchincloss Rutherfurd
- Alexandra Rutherfurd

== Later years and death ==
In 1966, the Rutherfurds moved to Hong Kong where Auchincloss Rutherfurd taught French at Chinese University of Hong Kong for two years. She also was an adviser and stockholder for the venture capital firm her husband co-founded and managed, Inter-Asia Venture Management. She later founded an overseas chapter of the League of Women Voters.

In August 1984, Auchincloss Rutherfurd was diagnosed with lung cancer. Despite undergoing aggressive treatments, the cancer spread to her brain and pancreas. On March 13, 1985, she died at Dana–Farber Cancer Institute in Boston at the age of 39. Her private funeral was held on March 19 at the Trinity Church in Newport, Rhode Island, after which she was buried at Common Burying Ground and Island Cemetery.

== Footnotes ==
=== Works cited ===
- Anthony, Carl Sferrazza (2002). The Kennedy White House: Family Life and Pictures, 1961-1963. Simon & Schuster. ISBN 0-743-21473-0.
- Pottker, Jan (2001). Janet and Jackie: The Story of a Mother and Her Daughter, Jacqueline Kennedy Onassis. Macmillan. ISBN 0-312-26607-3.
- Taraborrelli, J. Randy (2018). Jackie, Janet & Lee: The Secret Lives of Janet Auchincloss and Her Daughters, Jacqueline Kennedy Onassis and Lee Radziwill. New York: St. Martin’s Press. ISBN 978-1-250-12803-4.
- von Bothmer, Bernard (2010). Framing the Sixties: The Use and Abuse of a Decade from Ronald Reagan to George W. Bush. University of Massachusetts Press. ISBN 978-1-558-49732-0.
