= Annunciation Greek Orthodox Church (Manhattan) =

Church in Manhattan, New York

Coordinates: 40°47′31.4″N 73°58′33.6″W

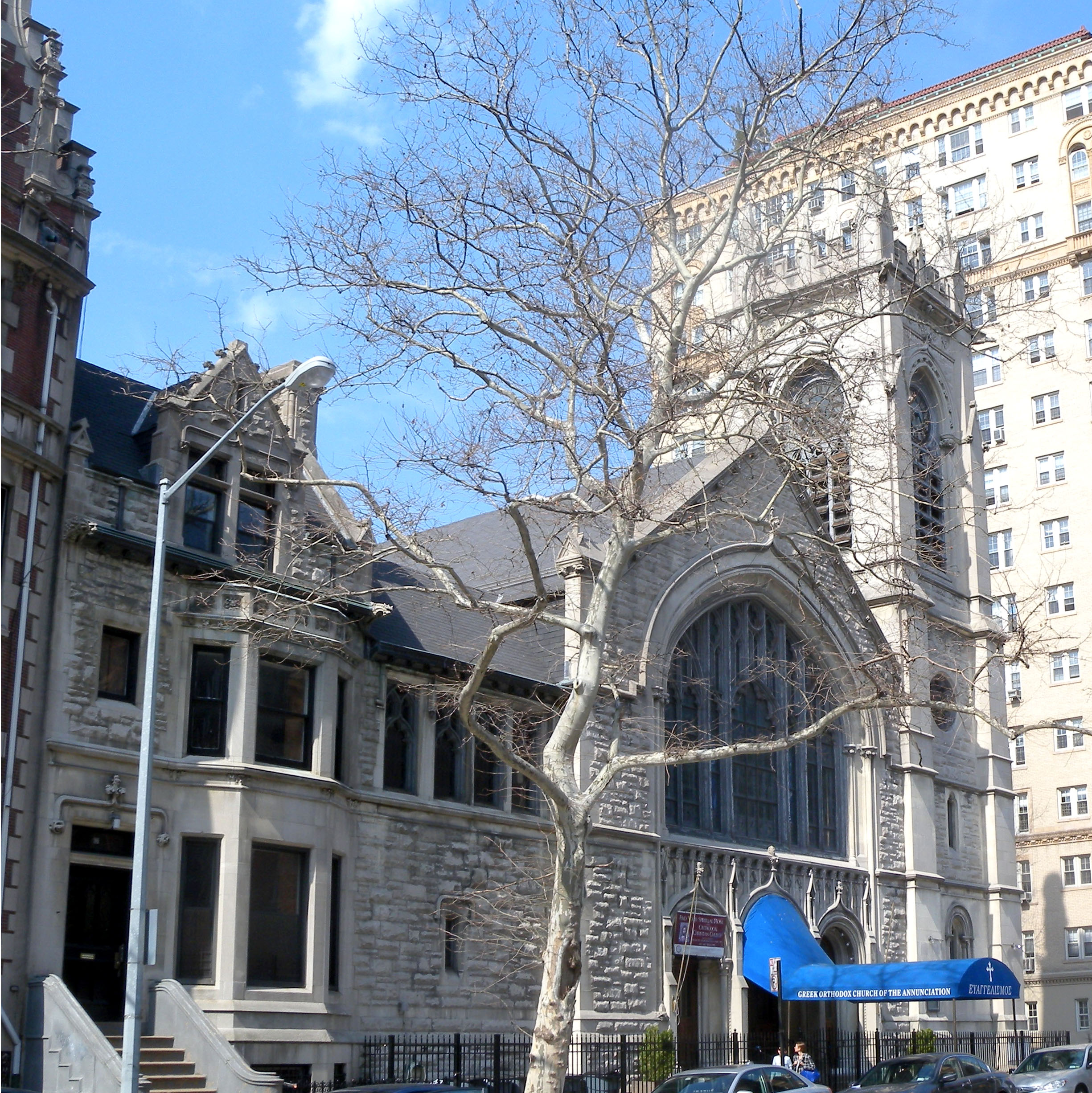

The Annunciation Greek Orthodox Church is a Greek Orthodox church at West End Avenue and West 91st Street on the Upper West Side of Manhattan in New York City. The church was built by Heins & LaFarge in 1893–94 as the Fourth Presbyterian Church. The church was sold to a Greek parish in 1952. The rusticated masonry façade with a sparing use of Venetian Gothic and Richardsonian Romanesque details and the square corner bell tower with a crenellated parapet embellished with gargoyle gutter-spouts reveal Richardson's training. Fine stained glass may be from Tiffany studios, or may be by John LaFarge, the architect's father, which would make them even rarer.

== See also ==
- Annunciation Greek Orthodox Church (Milwaukee), in Wisconsin, designed by Frank Lloyd Wright
