= Oswego Armory =

- U.S. National Register of Historic Places
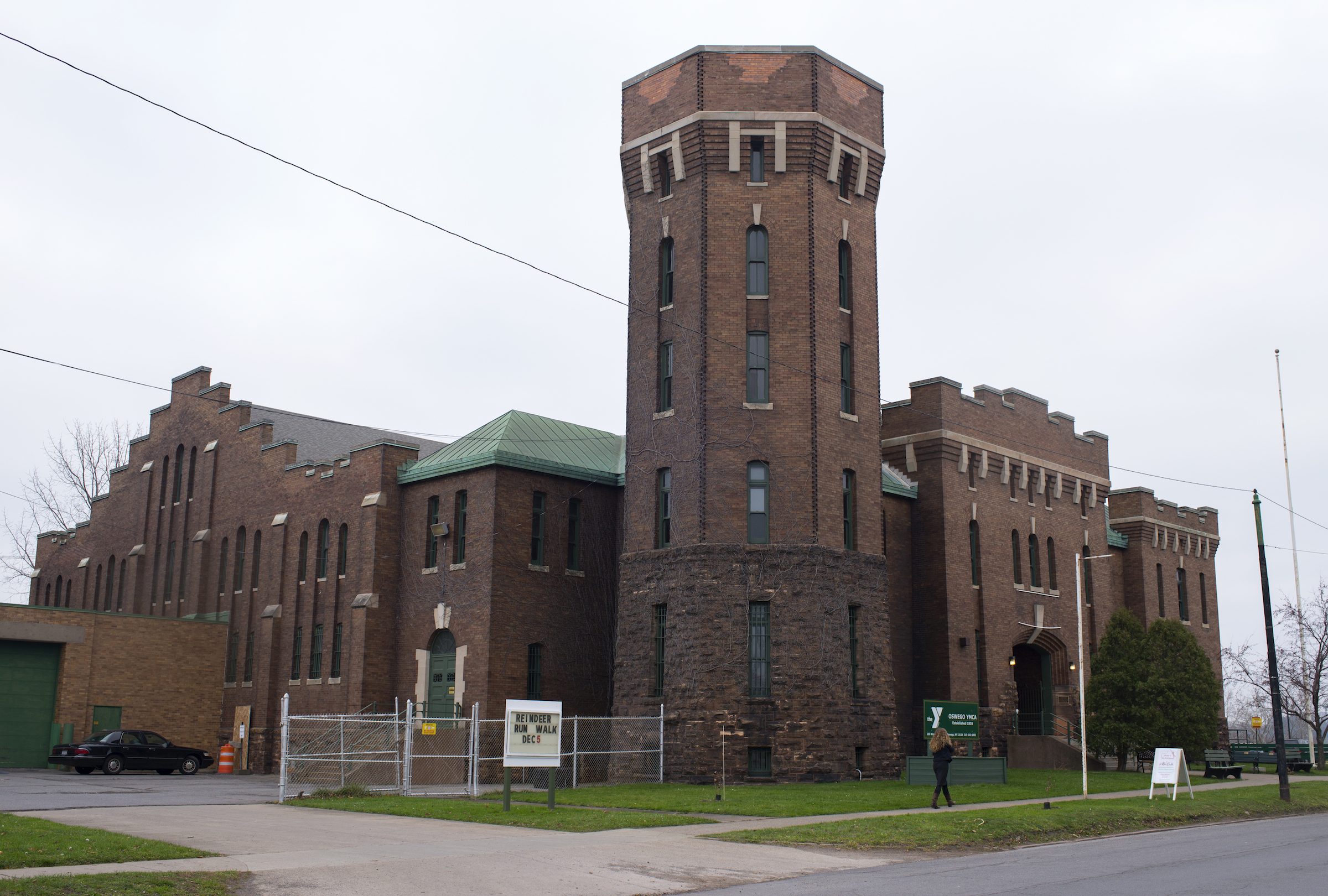
- The Oswego Armory (with filled-in battlements on the tower)

- Location within New York Location within the United States
- Location: 265 W. First St., Oswego, New York
- Coordinates: 43°27′14″N 76°30′35″W
- Area: 1.2 acres (0.49 ha)
- Built: 1906
- Architect: Heins, George L.
- NRHP reference No.: 88000610
- Added to NRHP: May 19, 1988

Oswego Armory is a historic National Guard armory located at Oswego in Oswego County, New York. It is a brick and stone castle-like structure built in 1906–1908. It was designed by State architect George L. Heins. It consists of a 2 1/2-story administration building with an attached large, gable-roofed drill shed. The building features a 5-story octagonal tower at the northwest corner.

It was listed on the National Register of Historic Places in 1988.

== Oswego YMCA ==
After the closing of the Armory in 2004, The Oswego YMCA purchased the Armory and now runs most of its Child and Teen activities out of the building.

== Humane Society ==
The Humane Society rents a single room in the basement of the Armory.
