= Lewis Polk Rutherfurd =

American-born financier (born 1944)

- Born: August 3, 1944 (age 82)
- Education: Princeton University; Harvard University
- Employer(s): Inter-Asia Venture Management, Ltd.
- Spouses: Janet Jennings Auchincloss (m. 1966; died 1985) Katharine duPont Sanger (m. 1989; div. 1994)
- Children: 3
- Relatives: Winthrop Rutherfurd (grandfather); Frank L. Polk (grandfather); Levi P. Morton (great-grandfather)

Lewis Polk Rutherfurd (born August 3, 1944) is an American-born financier who lives in Hong Kong. He was married to Janet Jennings Auchincloss, the half-sister of First Lady Jacqueline Lee "Jackie" Bouvier from 1966 until her death in 1985. In 1989, he married Katharine duPont Sanger, the granddaughter of Lammot du Pont II.

== Early life ==
Rutherfurd was born on August 3, 1944 to Alice Polk and Winthrop Rutherfurd, Jr. of New York and Fishers Island, former president of Coast Metals, a manufacturer of hard-surface metals in Little Ferry, New Jersey. His grandfathers were Winthrop Rutherfurd and Frank L. Polk, Under Secretary of State in Woodrow Wilson's cabinet and named founder of Davis Polk & Wardwell, and he is a great-grandson of Levi P. Morton, a Governor of New York who served as Vice-President of the United States under Benjamin Harrison.

Rutherfurd attended Princeton University, graduating in 1966 with a bachelor's degree in East Asian Studies, and later Harvard, where he earned an M.B.A. with distinction from the Harvard University Graduate School of Business.

== Career ==
In 1989, Rutherfurd was a managing director of Royal Trust Enterprise Capital, a venture capital firm in Hong Kong. He set up Inter-Asia Venture Management, Ltd, a venture capital firm, in Hong Kong in 1972, raising a $1 million for their first fund. They went on to complete 15 investments. In 1974, they expanded McDonald's into Hong Kong.

As of March 2016, Rutherfurd was the co-founder and Managing Director of Inter-Asia Venture Management, Ltd. He was a former Governor and Vice President of the American Chamber of Commerce in Hong Kong, an Advisory Board member of Princeton in Asia and a former trustee of Berkshire School. Rutherfurd is past Co-Chairman and executive committee member of the Hong Kong Venture Capital Association and acts as trustee of the Mary Wood Foundation.

== Personal life ==
On July 30, 1966, he married Janet Jennings Auchincloss (1945–1985), the daughter of stockbroker Hugh Dudley Auchincloss Jr. (1897–1976) and socialite Janet Norton Lee (1907–1989). Auchincloss had two half-sisters from her mother's first marriage to stockbroker John Vernou "Black Jack" Bouvier III, Jackie Kennedy and Lee Radziwill, three half-siblings from her father's previous marriages: Hugh III (born 1927), Nina (born 1935), and Thomas (born 1937), and one younger brother born to her parents, James Lee Auchincloss (born 1947). After their marriage, the couple moved to Hong Kong, where she later founded an overseas chapter of the League of Women Voters. Before her death from cancer on March 13, 1985, they had three children: Lewis Stuyvesant Rutherfurd, Andrew Hugh Auchincloss Rutherfurd, and Alexandra Rutherfurd.

On June 10, 1989, Rutherfurd married Katharine du Pont Sanger. Sanger was the granddaughter of Lammot du Pont II. They divorced in 1994.
