= Janet Lee Bouvier =

American socialite (1907–1989)

Janet Lee Auchincloss
- Born: Janet Norton Lee; December 3, 1907; New York City, U.S.
- Died: July 22, 1989 (aged 81); Newport, Rhode Island, U.S.
- Burial place: Common Burying Ground and Island Cemetery, Newport, Rhode Island
- Other names: Janet Bouvier, Janet Auchincloss, Janet Morris
- Education: Miss Spence's School; Sweet Briar College; Barnard College
- Occupation: Socialite
- Known for: Mother of Jacqueline Kennedy
- Spouses: John Vernou Bouvier III (m. 1928; div. 1940) Hugh D. Auchincloss (m. 1942; died 1976) Bingham W. Morris (m. 1979)
- Children: 4, including Jacqueline Kennedy, Lee Radziwill and Janet Auchincloss Rutherfurd
- Father: James T. Lee

Janet Norton Bouvier Auchincloss (née Lee; December 3, 1907 – July 22, 1989) was an American socialite. She was the mother of the former First Lady Jacqueline Kennedy and Lee Radziwill, and the mother-in-law of John F. Kennedy.

== Early life and education ==
Janet Norton Lee was born on December 3, 1907, in Manhattan, New York City. She was the middle daughter of James T. Lee (1877–1968), a lawyer and real estate developer, and Margaret A. Merritt (1880–1943). Although she made differing claims about her genealogy, including that she was “from the Maryland Lees,” both her parents were of Irish Catholic descent. She had two sisters: Marion Merritt Lee (1904–1947), who married John J. Ryan Jr. and was subsequently the mother of Mary Cecil, wife of William Amherst Vanderbilt Cecil, and Margaret Winifred Lee (1910–1991), who married Franklin D'Olier, great-uncle of actor Christopher Reeve.

Janet graduated from Miss Spence's School and attended Sweet Briar and Barnard Colleges. She was a member of the Barnard College class of 1929 but records show that she did not graduate. She was a three-time winner of the hunter championship at the National Horse Show.

== Career ==
Bouvier served as a board member of the Newport Historical Society and the Redwood Library. She was also the honorary director of the Robert E. Lee Memorial Association in Stratford, Virginia.

== Personal life ==
Bouvier was married three times. In 1928, she married John Vernou Bouvier III (1891–1957), the son of Major John Vernou Bouvier Jr. (1866–1948), a successful attorney, and Maude Frances Sergeant (1870–1940). He was also the brother of Edith Bouvier Beale (1895–1977), later known as the subject of the documentary film, Grey Gardens. Together, they were the parents of two daughters:

- Jacqueline Lee Bouvier (1929–1994), who married John F. Kennedy in 1953. After his assassination in 1963, she later married Aristotle Onassis in 1968 and remained married to Onassis until his death in 1975.
- Caroline Lee Bouvier (1933–2019), who married Michael Temple Canfield in 1953. Their marriage was annulled in 1962, and later that same year she married Prince Stanisław Albrecht Radziwiłł. They divorced in 1974. In 1988 she married the director Herbert Ross. They divorced in 2001.

Bouvier's womanizing and drinking led to a separation in 1936, a brief reconciliation for a few months in 1937, and then a divorce in 1940.

In 1942, she married Hugh Dudley Auchincloss Jr., an attorney and Standard Oil heir; becoming his third wife. Together, they had two children:

- Janet Jennings Auchincloss (1945–1985), who was married to Lewis Polk Rutherfurd in 1966.
- James Lee Auchincloss (born 1947)

Hugh Auchincloss died in 1976. In 1979, she married for a third time, to her childhood friend Bingham Willing "Booch" Morris (1906–1996). Jacqueline served as her witness. Morris, a widower, was a retired investment banker who lived in Southampton, New York, a graduate of St. George's School and Harvard, where he was a member of the Iroquois and Hasty Pudding Clubs, and was the son of Violet Lee (née Willing) Morris and John Boucher Morris of Baltimore. His late wife, Mary (née Rawlins) Morris, had been a bridesmaid at Janet's first wedding. Morris and Bouvier separated in 1981, but remained married until her death from complications arising from Alzheimer's disease in 1989.
