= Heins & LaFarge =

American architectural firm

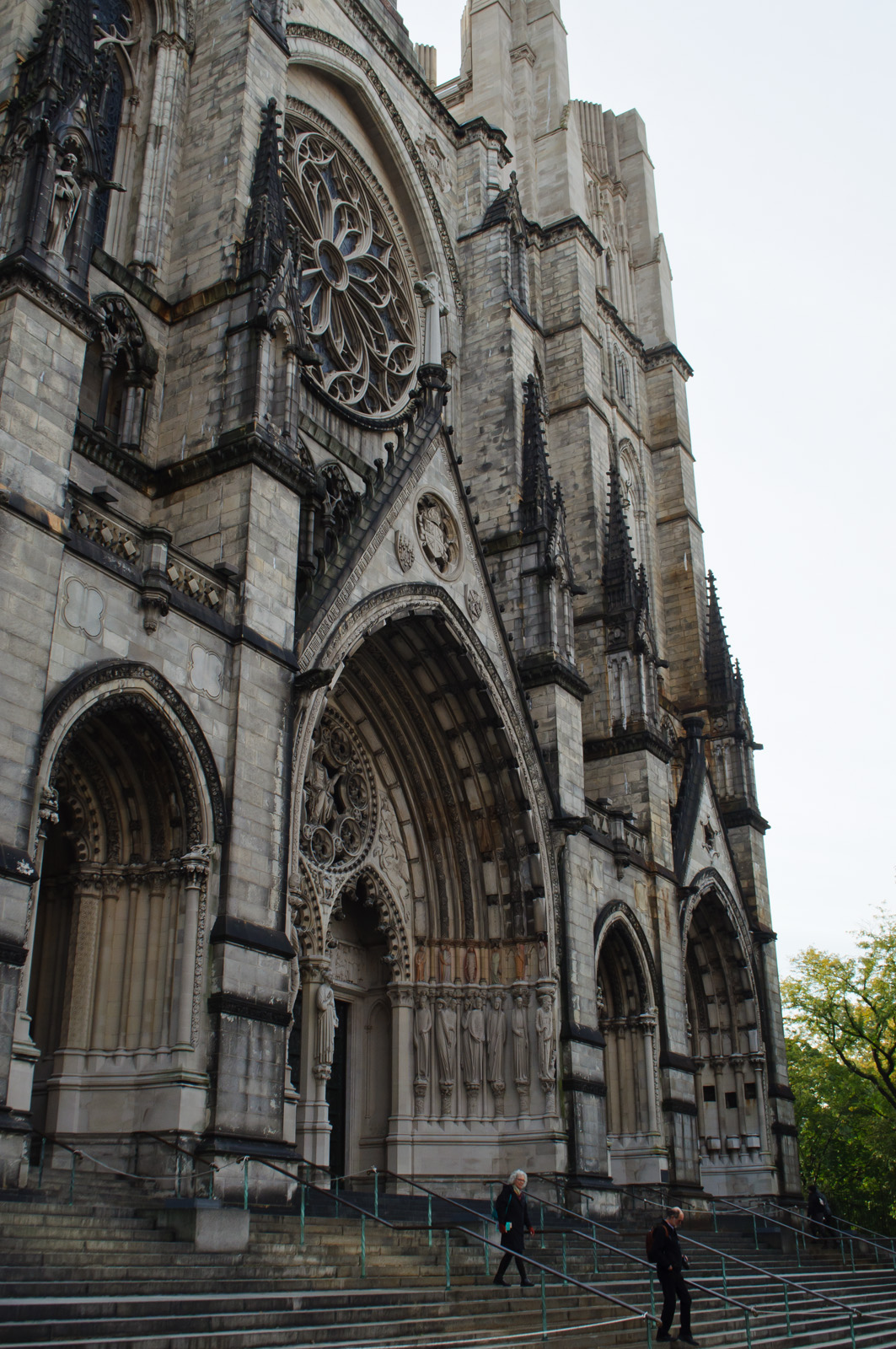
Cathedral of St. John the Divine in Manhattan, New York City

Heins & LaFarge was a New York City–based architectural firm founded by Philadelphia-born architect George Lewis Heins (1860–1907) and Christopher Grant LaFarge (1862–1938), the eldest son of the artist John La Farge. They were the architects for the original Romanesque-Byzantine east end and crossing of the Cathedral of St. John the Divine in Manhattan, and for the original Astor Court buildings of the Bronx Zoo, which formed a complete ensemble reflecting the aesthetic of the City Beautiful movement. Heins & LaFarge provided the architecture and details for the Interborough Rapid Transit Company, the first precursor to the New York City Subway.

== Early career ==
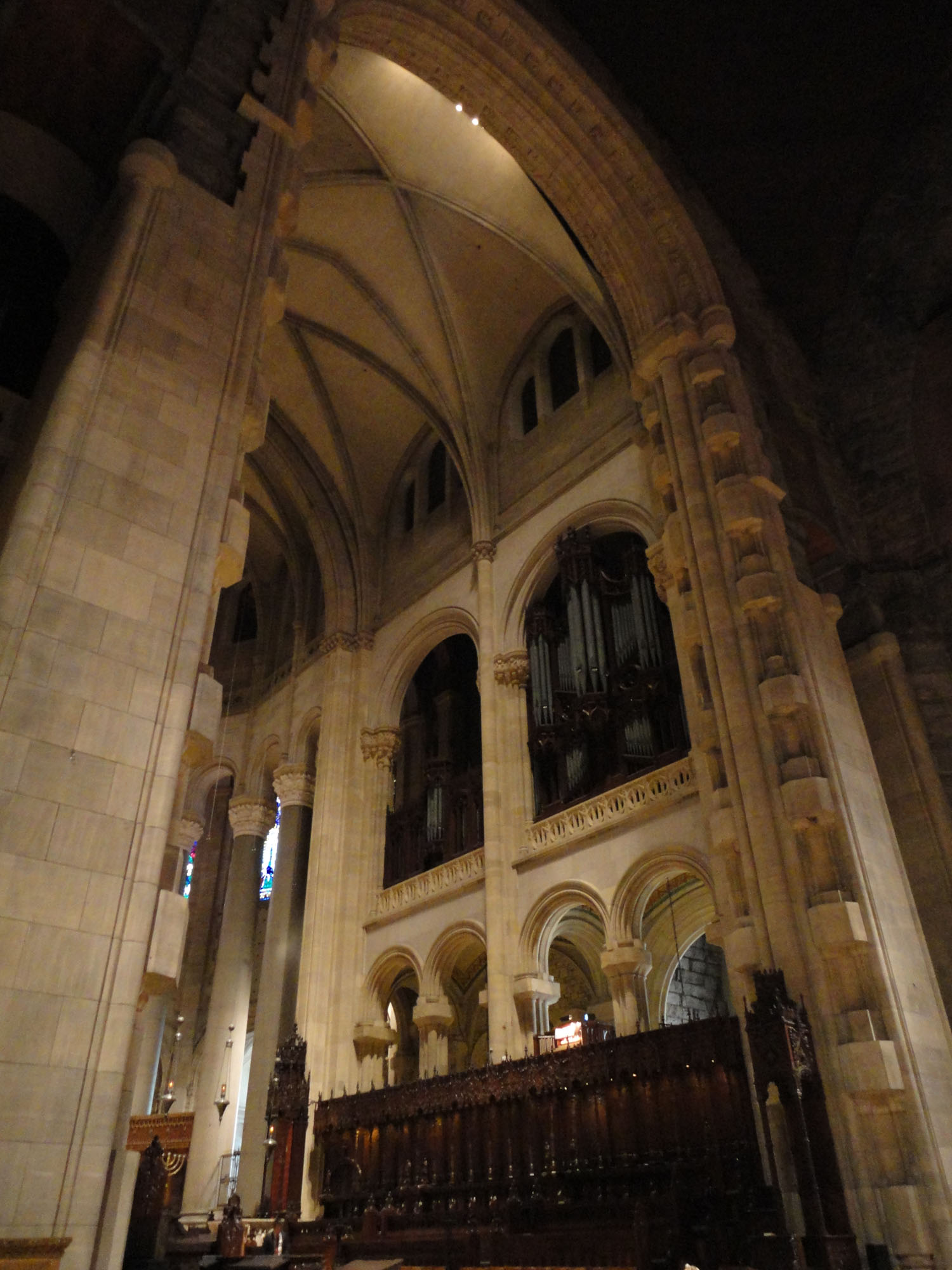
Interior view of Cathedral of St. John the Divine in Manhattan

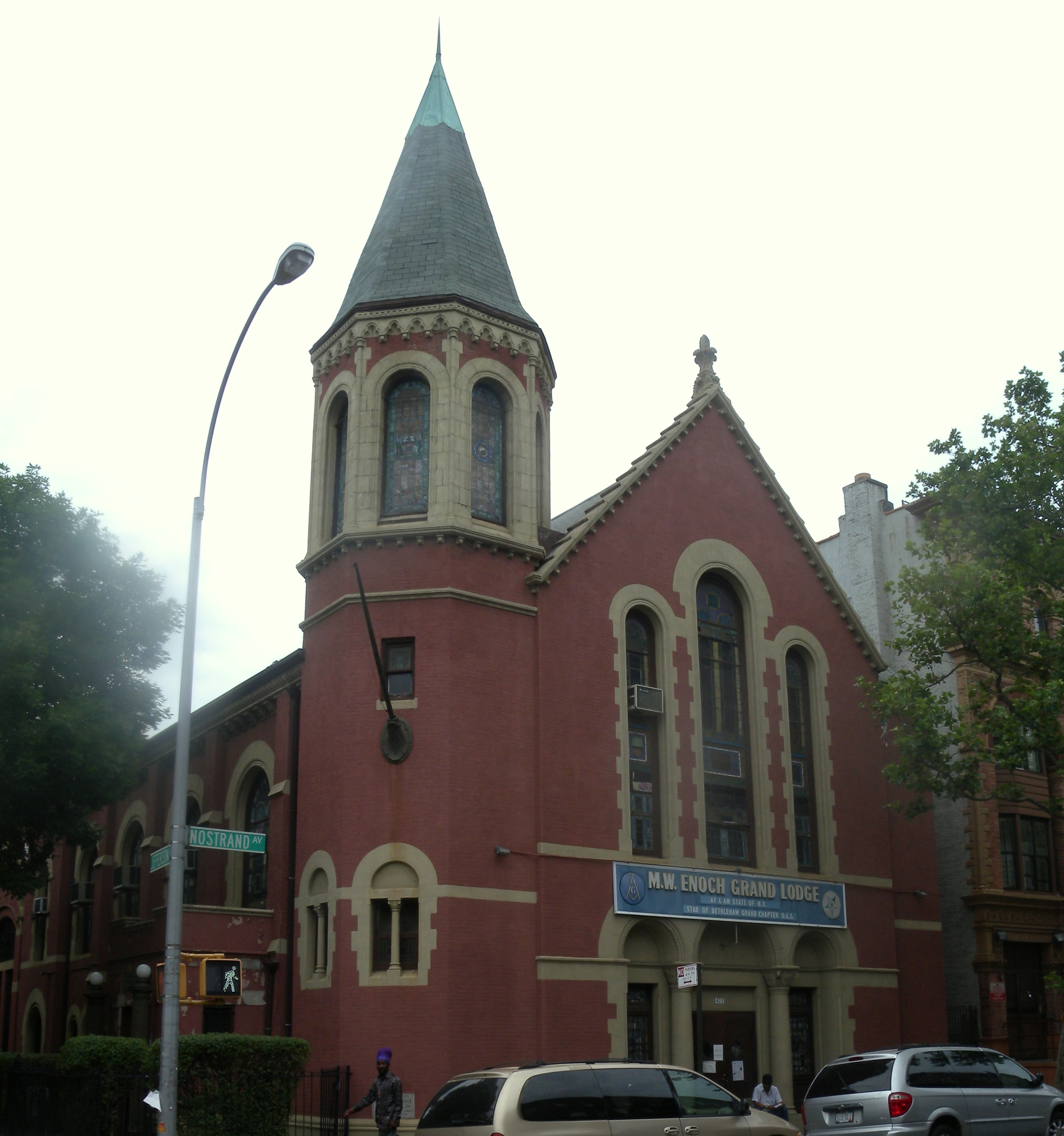
Enoch Grand Lodge in Brooklyn

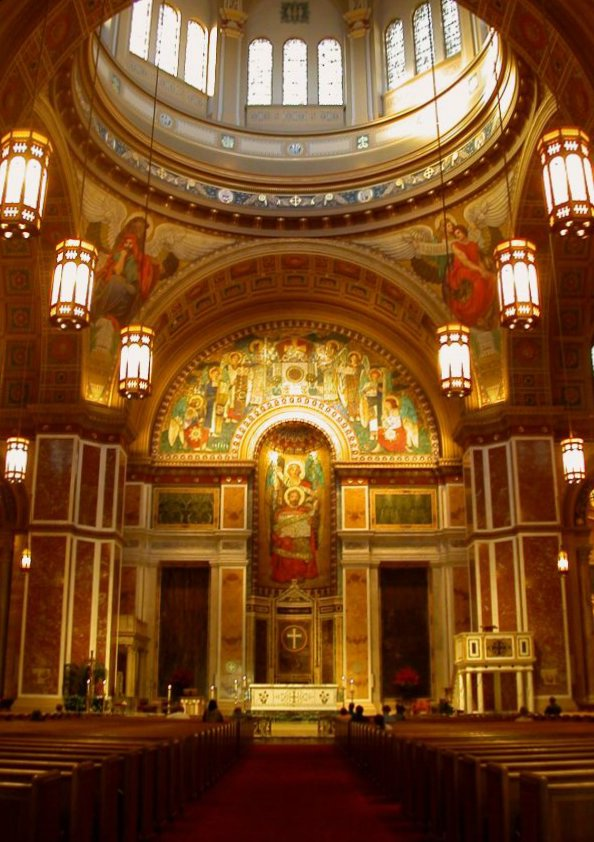
The domed crossing on Cathedral of St. Matthew the Apostle in Washington D.C., built in 1893

The two young men met at Massachusetts Institute of Technology and trained together in the Boston offices of Henry Hobson Richardson. Heins married LaFarge's aunt Aimée La Farge, the youngest sister of John La Farge, who was only two years older than her nephew. In 1886, they opened their office. Heins was the man on the site; LaFarge was the principal designer.

In 1888, a design competition for the Cathedral of St. John the Divine, the most prominent project of its kind in the U.S., was entered by 68 architectural firms, and won in 1891 by Heins & LaFarge, with an eclectic design, based on Romanesque forms but with many Byzantine and Gothic elements, dominated by a massive spired tower over the crossing. The cornerstone was laid December 27, 1892, but unexpectedly, massive excavation was required before bedrock was hit. Heins & LaFarge completed the east end and the crossing, temporarily roofed by Rafael Guastavino with a tiled dome (still standing). The Chapel of St. Columba was consecrated in 1911, but the death of Heins ended the contract with Heins & LaFarge. Some of the Cathedral trustees did not care for the original Romanesque-Byzantine design, preferring something more purely Gothic, and consequently they removed the project from LaFarge, the surviving architect of the team. They hired a new architect Ralph Adams Cram, whose nave and west front would be continued in French Gothic style.

The other prime commission in New York City was the Fourth Presbyterian Church (1893–94), now Annunciation Greek Orthodox Church, at West End Avenue and West 91st Street on the Upper West Side, a tribute to their joint master. The rusticated masonry façade with a sparing use of Venetian Gothic and Richardsonian Romanesque details and the square corner bell tower with a crenellated parapet embellished with gargoyle gutter-spouts reveal Richardson's training. The fine stained glass may be from Tiffany studios, or may be by John La Farge, the architect's father, which would make them even rarer.

An exercise in a somewhat subdued Richardsonian manner, in the Bedford-Stuyvesant section of Brooklyn, is Heins & LaFarge's Reformed Episcopal Church of the Reconciliation (1890), now the Most Worshipful Enoch Grand Lodge of the Order of Masons. It too has a corner tower that is octagonal and embedded in the volume of the church in a most Richardsonian manner, though the materials used are tame, brick, now painted, rather than Richardsonian rustication.

In Washington D.C., the Cathedral of St. Matthew the Apostle, was begun in 1893, to designs of LaFarge. It is a brick structure of an abbreviated Latin cross floorplan with such a prominent crossing dome, raised on an octagonal drum lit by ranges of arch-headed windows, that has something of the aspect of a centrally-planned Greek cross. The interior is rich with frescoes and mosaics and inlaid marble floors in full American Renaissance manner. The first Mass was celebrated on June 2, 1895, and the completed church was dedicated in 1913. The firm designed other Catholic churches, including the Church of the Blessed Sacrament in Providence, Rhode Island., and Holy Trinity Church in West Point, New York. La Farge has been called "America's leading church architect".

== Mid career ==
In 1899, Heins was appointed New York State architect by Governor Theodore Roosevelt, and he designed interiors for the first buildings at the State University of New York, Albany: the Auditorium and the Science and Administration Buildings. He held that position until his death in 1907. While serving in that capacity his office designed the Flushing Armory, Geneva Armory, Gloversville Armory, Medina Armory, Main Street Armory in Rochester, Oneonta Armory and Oswego Armory. LaFarge, a fellow of the American Institute of Architects (AIA), often served on advisory committees for the schools of architecture at Columbia University, M.I.T. and Princeton University, and also as trustee and secretary for the American Academy in Rome.

Roosevelt was also a prime mover behind the creation of the New York Zoological Society, for whom the partners designed the original nucleus of buildings (1899–1910, now called the Astor Court) as a series of pavilions symmetrically grouped round the large sea lion pool, all in a sturdy brick and limestone Roman Ionic and Doric, with the heads of elephants and rhinos, lions and zebras projecting festively from panels and friezes. The central Administration Building (1910), offering an arched passageway to the zoo's outdoor spaces, has complicated domed spaces formed of Guastavino tile.

University commissions were also in their oeuvre. At Yale University, their rusticated Richardsonian Romanesque design for a chapter building of St. Anthony Hall, also known as the Delta Psi fraternity, stood from 1894 to 1913. Their ornamental iron gates were re-used in the 1913 successor by Charles C. Haight. In 1899, Heins & LaFarge built the Houghton Memorial Chapel at Wellesley College, Wellesley, Massachusetts, Richardsonian in its recessed entrance, dominating central tower and interpenetrating Romanesque massing. Also in 1899, at the United States Military Academy, West Point, they erected the Roman Catholic chapel of the Most Holy Trinity, also hearkening back to their Richardson apprenticeship with an essay in rusticated granite, with a battlemented corner tower and a heavy arcaded porch. It was enlarged in 1959.

== End of career ==
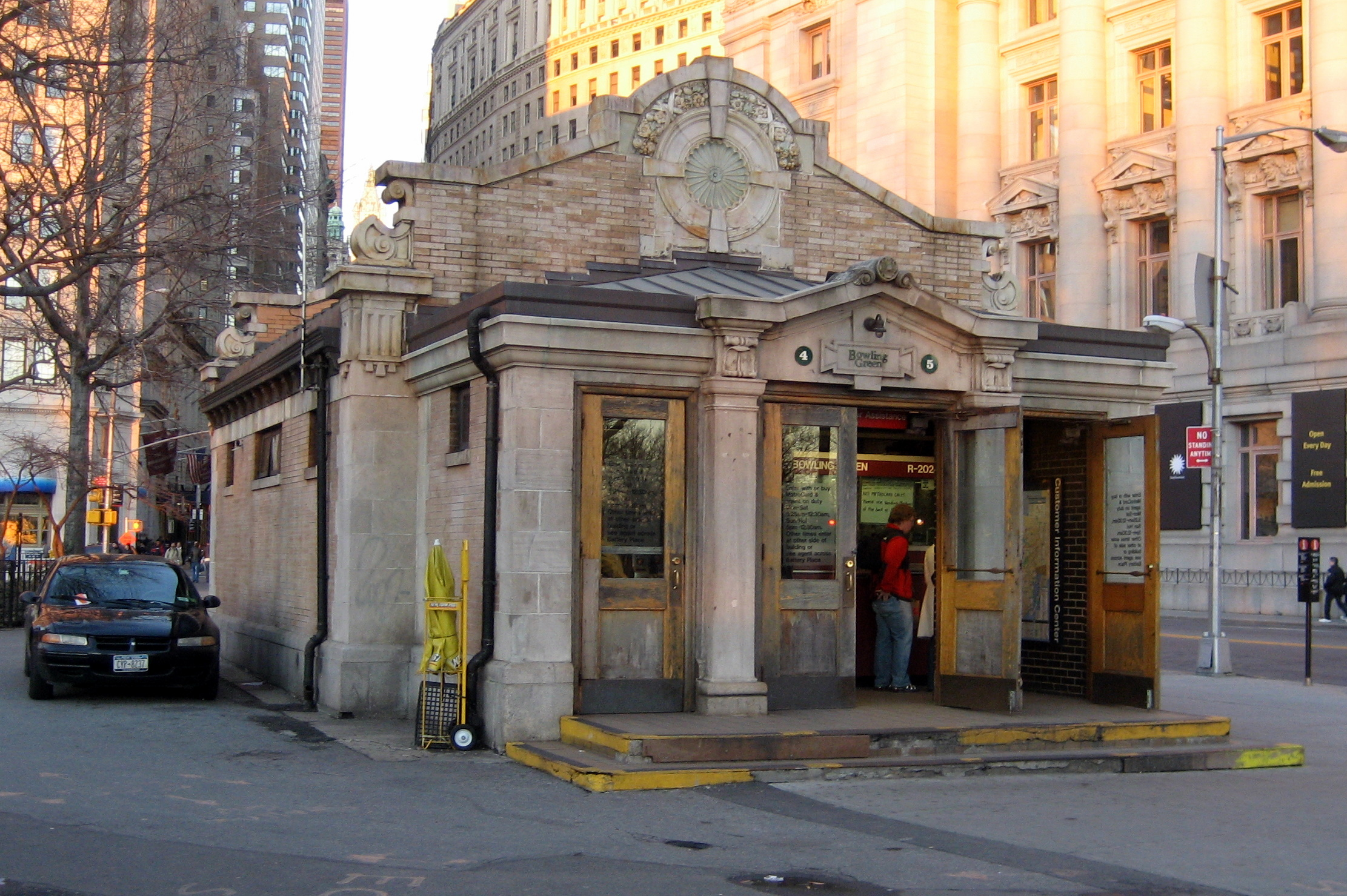
IRT Control house at Bowling Green station, 1905

In 1903, Heins & LaFarge were commissioned to design the Municipal Building for Washington, D.C.

Beginning in 1901, Heins & LaFarge designed subway stations and buildings for the Interborough Rapid Transit Company under the direction of the chief engineer, William Barclay Parsons. When the Interborough Rapid Transit's original line opened on October 27, 1904, its showpiece station was City Hall, designed by Heins & LaFarge using uninterrupted sweeping Guastavino-tiled arches and vaults which incorporated shaped skylights and mosaics and polychrome terracotta panels.

Throughout the original stations the polychrome faience panels (from Grueby Faience Company, Boston, and the Atlantic Terra Cotta Company of Staten Island and New Jersey) were designed by the firm, using several tile patterns. The partners' control house for the IRT is at Bowling Green station under Manhattan's Bowling Green at the corner of the Battery in the Dutch Renaissance manner reminiscent of New Amsterdam. A few Heins & LaFarge subway entrances survive, including the one at 72nd Street and Broadway. After Heins died in 1907, LaFarge decided to pursue a solo practice and in 1908 was replaced as architect in charge of the IRT project by Squire J. Vickers.

In 1904, they were commissioned to design the Roman Catholic Cathedral of St James in Seattle by Bishop Edward J. O’Dea, whose diocese had purchased property on Seattle’s First Hill and demanded a cathedral "that must surpass anything in the West." The Italian quattrocento design features tall, paired campanili at the west end and a central dome. The firm sent two young architects, W. Marbury Somervell and Joseph S. Coté, to oversee construction on the site, who went on to establish a thriving architectural practice in Seattle.

The cornerstone ceremony took place on November 12, 1905. The cathedral was completed in 1907 and solemnly dedicated on December 22, 1907. Unhappily, under the weight of two feet of wet snow the dome collapsed on the afternoon of February 2, 1916, dropping 400 tons of masonry eighty feet into the empty cathedral, shattering every window and leaving a gaping hole that exposed it to the elements. The cathedral reopened on March 18, 1917, but with a flat roof over the crossing. The central repositioning of the altar in response to reforms of the Second Vatican Council has finally brought it into the position envisaged by the architects.

In 1909, Christopher La Farge designed Matinecock Point on the North Shore of Long Island for Jack Morgan, the only son of J.P. Morgan. Construction was completed in 1913. It had 14-foot ceilings, reception rooms that each measured roughly thirty-by-thirty feet, marble fireplaces and sinks, carved moldings, a small gymnasium, and secret panels hidden in several walls. LaFarge also laid out stables, cottages, outbuildings plus an extensive farm complex for Morgan's prize-winning herd of Blue-Ribbon Jersey cattle, chickens, and hothouse flowers. The gardens were planted with all sorts of exotic trees and flowers, and even up until the 1970s orange trees could still be found on the lawns. Taken as a whole, the bill for the construction of the Matinecock Point estate came in at $2.5 million.

In 1914-15, the firm constructed a new 10-story headquarters building for the clothing store Brooks Brothers, located at 346 Madison Ave. on the corner of 44th St. in New York City. Designed in tandem with the firm of Clinton and Russell, the building had a tripartite design that began from a three-story stone base, followed by a five-story red brick middle section, and finished off with a stone section featuring two-story arched openings framed by Corinthian pilasters. Stylistically, it referenced Italian Renaissance models and cost some $750,000 to construct.

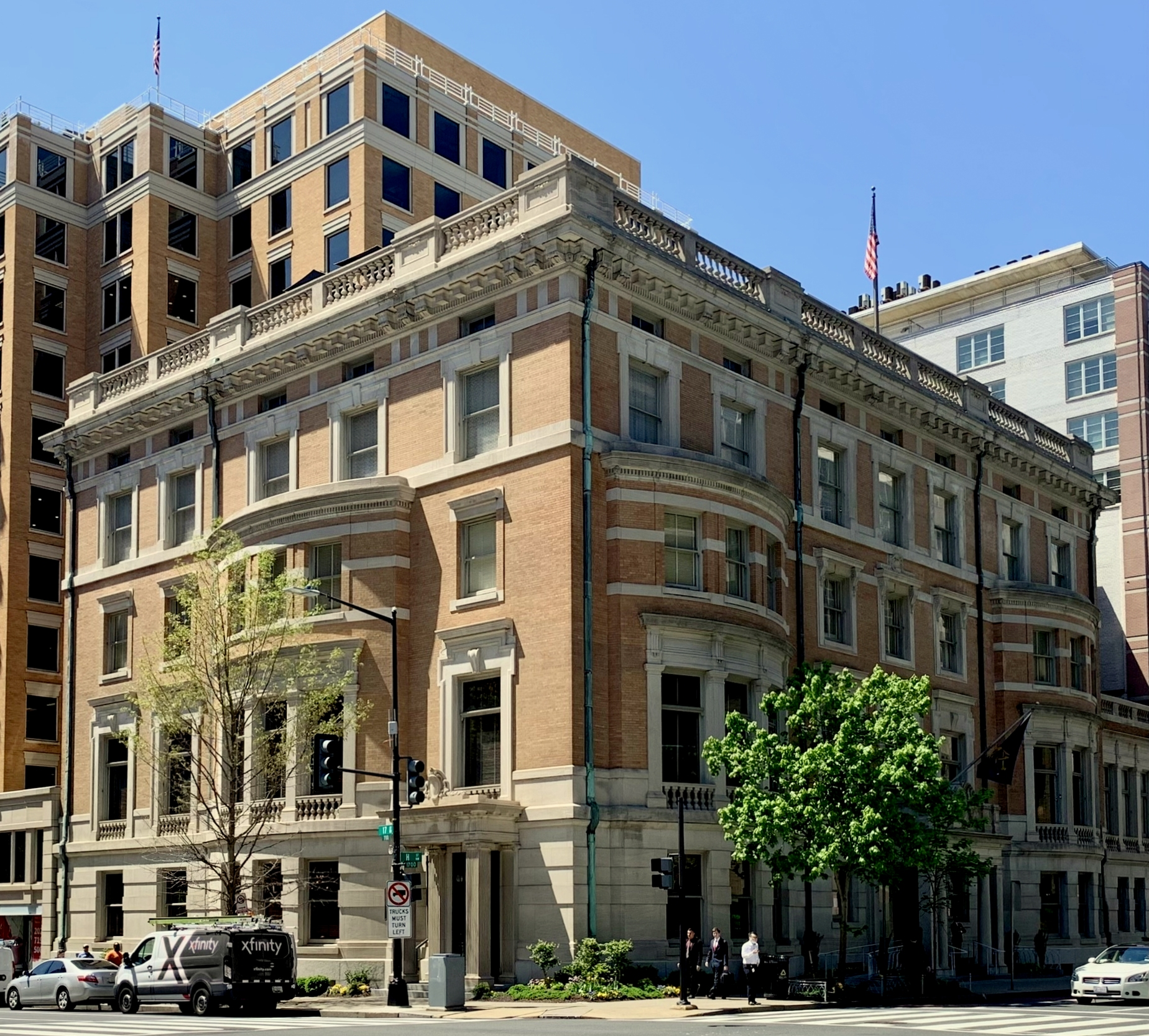
Metropolitan Club in Washington, D.C., built in 1908

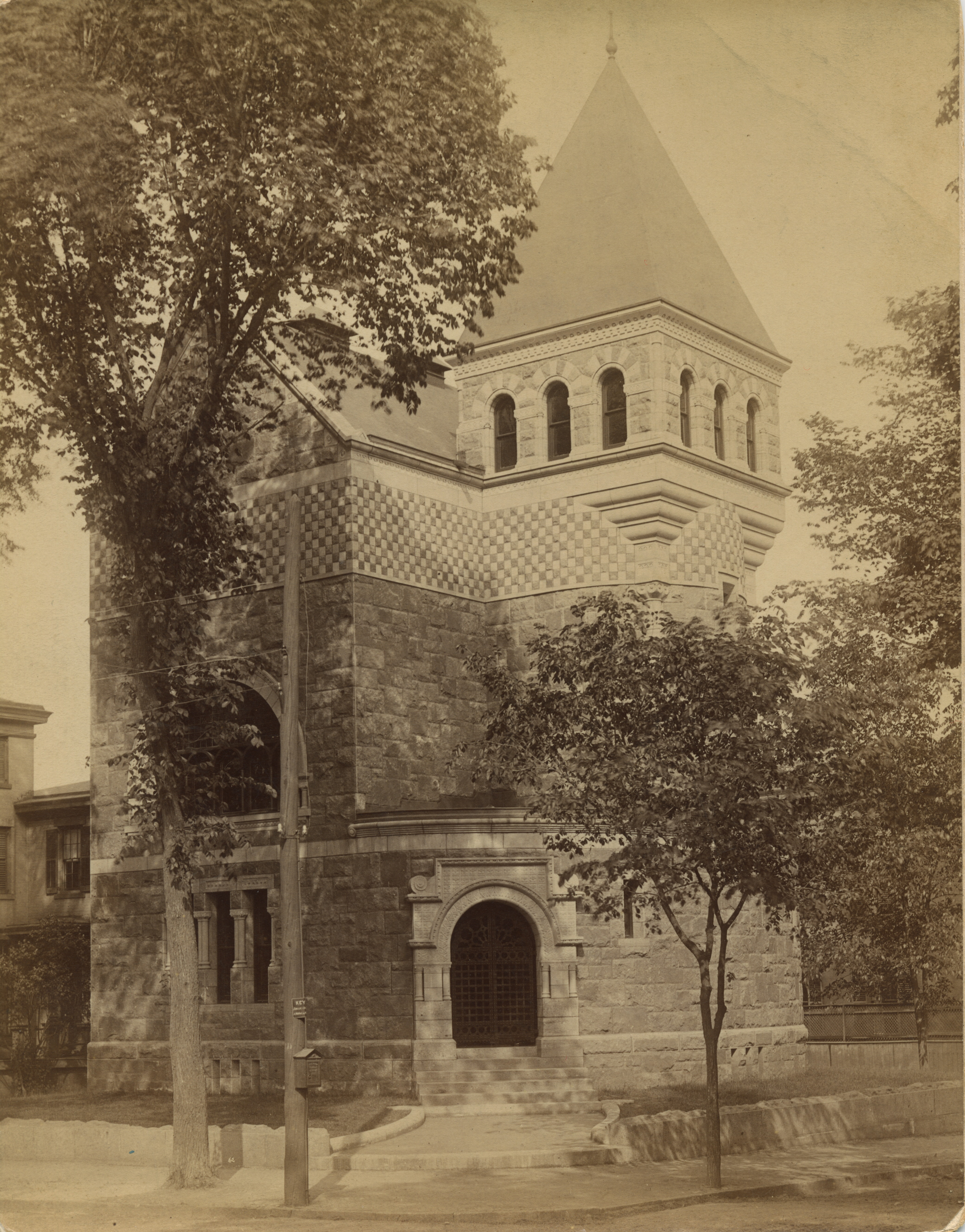
Heins & LaFarge, 1894-1913, Yale St. Anthony Hall at Yale University in New Haven, Connecticut (no longer extant)

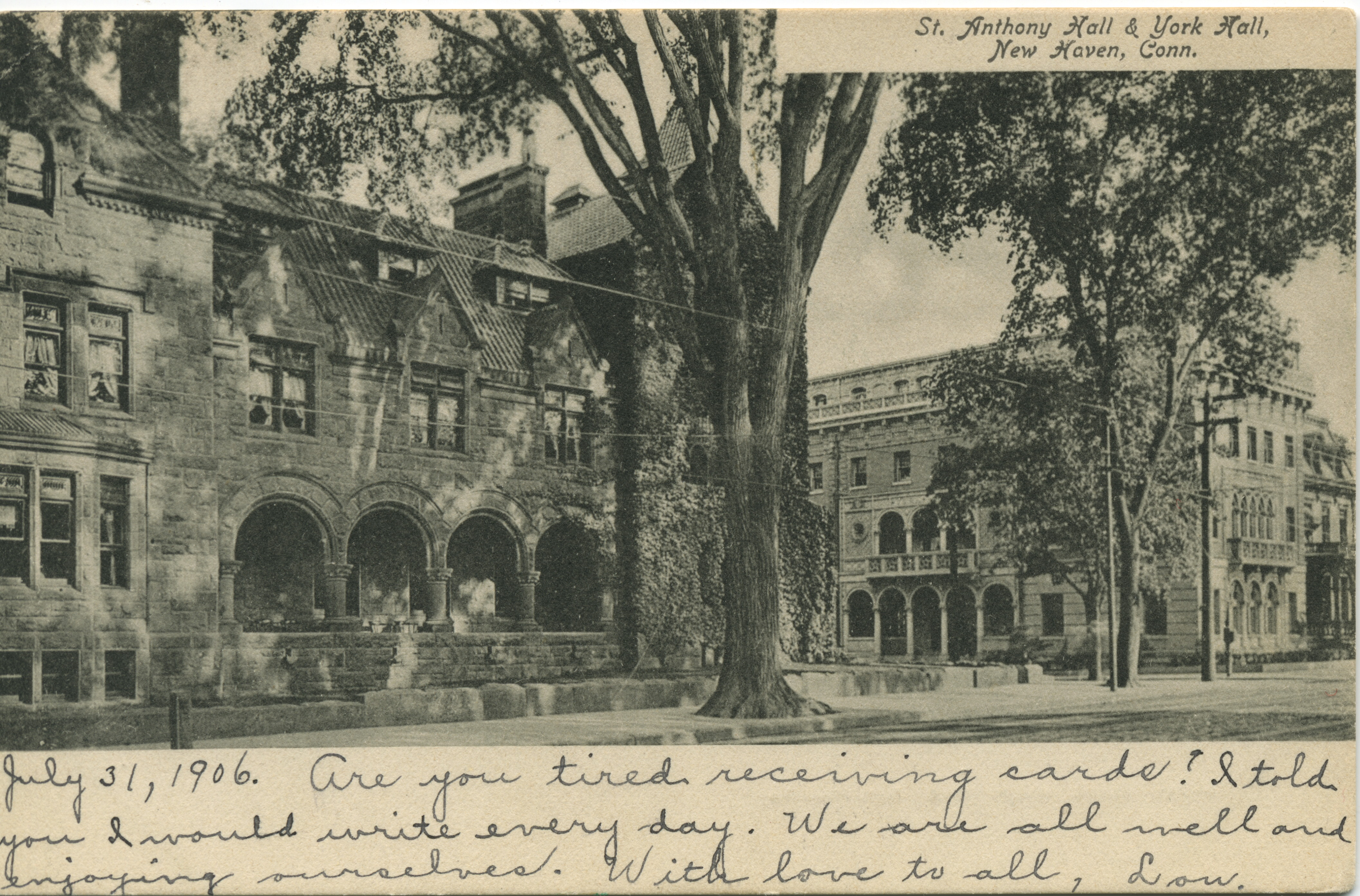
Yale St. Anthony Hall, with later-added dormitory at Yale University (no longer extant)

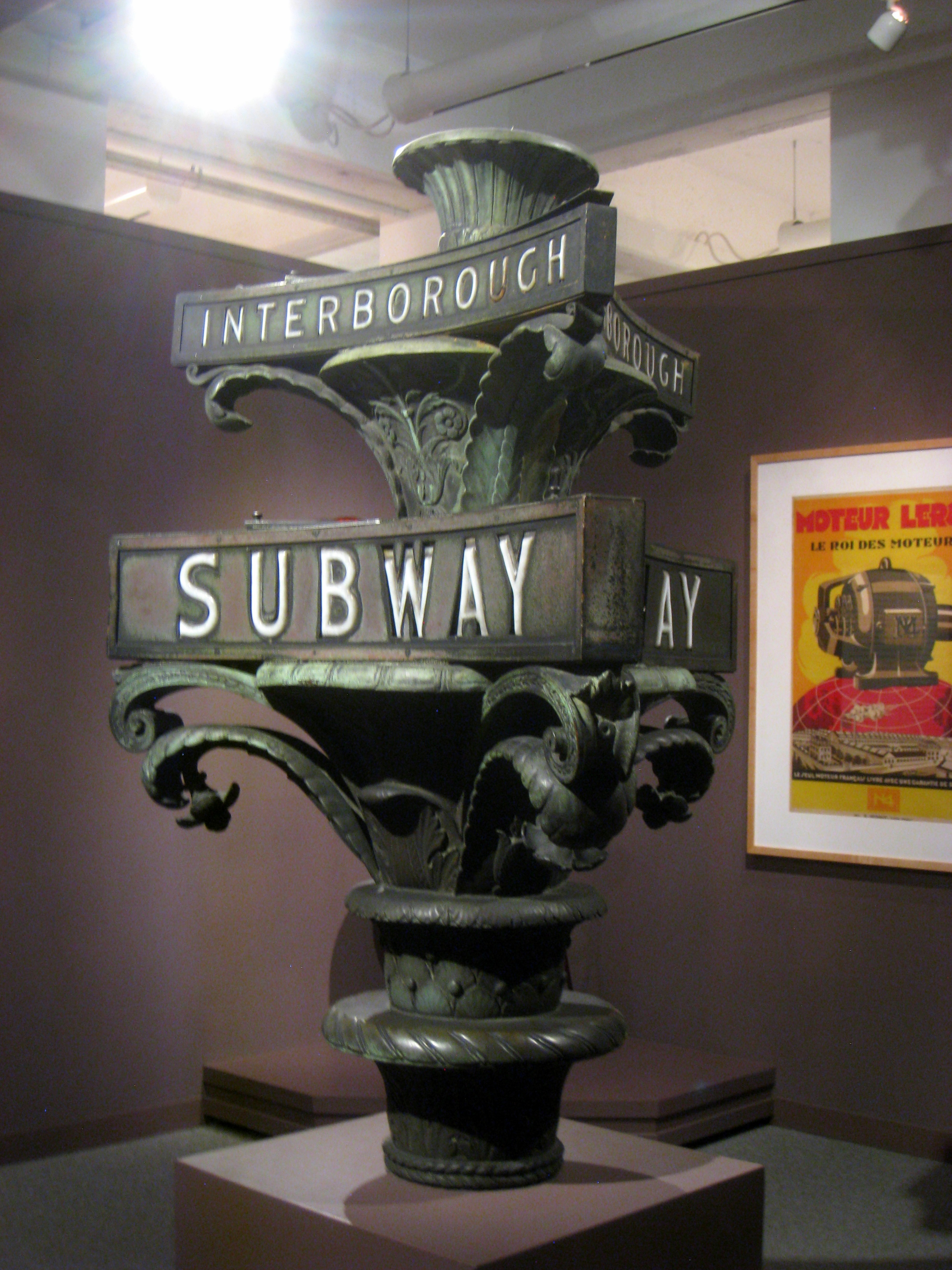
Sign for New York City's Interborough Subway, c. 1904
