= John Vernou Bouvier III =

American Wall Street stockbroker

- Bouvier in 1949
- Born: May 19, 1891; New York City, U.S.
- Died: August 3, 1957 (aged 66); New York City, U.S.
- Burial place: Most Holy Trinity Catholic Cemetery
- Other name: Black Jack Bouvier
- Education: Columbia University; Yale University (BA)
- Occupation: Stockbroker
- Spouse: Janet Norton Lee (m. 1928; div. 1940)
- Children: Jacqueline; Caroline
- Parents: Maude Frances Sergeant; John Vernou Bouvier Jr.
- Family: Bouvier family

John Vernou "Black Jack" Bouvier III (/ˈbuːvieɪ/ BOO-vee-ay; May 19, 1891 – August 3, 1957) was an American Wall Street stockbroker and socialite. He was the father of First Lady Jacqueline Kennedy Onassis and of socialite Princess Lee Radziwill, and was the father-in-law of John F. Kennedy.

== Early life and education ==
John Vernou Bouvier III was born May 19, 1891, in Manhattan, New York City, the eldest of five children, to John Vernou Bouvier Jr. and Maude Frances Bouvier (née Sergeant). His nickname, "Black Jack", referred to his flamboyant lifestyle.

Bouvier's great-grandfather, Michel Charles Bouvier, was a French cabinetmaker from Pont-Saint-Esprit, France. Michel immigrated to Philadelphia in 1815 after fighting in the Napoleonic Wars, worked for Joseph Bonaparte, married, was widowed, and then married Louise Clifford Vernou.

In addition to crafting fine furniture, Michel Bouvier had a business distributing firewood. To support that business, he acquired large tracts of forested land, some of which contained a large reserve of coal. Michel further grew his fortune in real estate speculation. His sons, Eustes, Michel Charles (M.C.), and John V. Bouvier Sr., distinguished themselves in the world of finance on Wall Street. They left their fortunes to their only remaining male Bouvier heir, Major John Vernou Bouvier Jr., who used some of the money to buy an estate known as Lasata in East Hampton, Long Island.

Major John Vernou Bouvier, Jr., a successful attorney, and Maude Frances Sergeant, had five children, of whom John Vernou Bouvier III was the eldest. Their other children were William Sergeant "Bud" Bouvier, who was born in 1893 and died from alcoholism in 1929; Edith Ewing Bouvier Beale, who was born in 1895 and became the wife of Phelan Beale, Sr. and the mother of Edith Bouvier Beale, Phelan Beale, Jr., and Bouvier Beale; and twins Maude Reppelin Bouvier Davis and Michelle Caroline Bouvier Scott Putnam (born 1905).

John Vernou Bouvier III attended Philips Exeter Academy and Columbia Grammar & Preparatory School. He then studied at Columbia College, his father's alma mater, where he played tennis for two years before transferring to the Sheffield Scientific School at Yale University. While attending Yale, Bouvier was a member of the Book and Snake secret society and the Cloister Club. He graduated in 1914.

== Career and military service ==
Upon his graduation, Bouvier went to work as a stockbroker at his father and uncle's firm: Bouvier, Bouvier & Bouvier. In 1917, he left the firm to join the United States Navy during World War I. Bouvier transferred to the United States Army, where he rose to the rank of major. Bouvier's 1920 engagement announcement stated he had served in the Army Air Service. Bouvier was discharged in 1919, whereupon he went back to work as a stockbroker on Wall Street.

In 1940, Bouvier became a hereditary member of the Maryland Society of the Cincinnati.

== Personal life ==
On April 7, 1920, the New York Sun published an engagement announcement for Bouvier and Miss Eleanor Carroll Daingerfield Carter, of Baltimore. The announcement stated she was a descendant of Reverdy Johnson. The engagement was later called off.

Bouvier later married Janet Norton Lee, a daughter of real estate developer James T. Lee, on July 7, 1928, at St. Philomena's Church in East Hampton. They had two daughters, Jacqueline Lee "Jackie" Bouvier (1929–1994) and Caroline Lee Bouvier (1933–2019). Bouvier's drinking, gambling, and philandering led to the couple's divorce in June 1940. Bouvier never remarried.

In June 1942, Janet Lee Bouvier married Hugh Dudley Auchincloss, Jr. Janet reportedly did not want her ex-husband to escort his daughter, Jacqueline, down the aisle for her 1953 wedding to John F. Kennedy as he had done at the wedding of his other daughter, Lee, earlier that year, so Jacqueline was instead escorted by her step-father. However, some reports indicated Bouvier was too intoxicated to escort his daughter, leading Auchincloss to step in to give the bride away.

By the mid-1950s, Bouvier had sporadic contact with his daughters and family. He spent the majority of his time drinking alone at his New York City apartment located at 125 East 74th Street.

== Later life and death ==
In the spring of 1957, Bouvier was diagnosed with terminal liver cancer. He checked into Lenox Hill Hospital on July 27, 1957, to undergo chemotherapy. Five days later, Bouvier fell into a coma. He died on August 3 at age 66. Bouvier's funeral, which was arranged by his daughters, Jacqueline and Lee, was held at St. Patrick's Cathedral in Manhattan after which his body was buried in the Bouvier family plot at Most Holy Trinity Catholic Cemetery in East Hampton, New York.

== In popular culture ==
Bouvier was portrayed by Rod Taylor in the TV film biography Jacqueline Bouvier Kennedy in 1981.

Bouvier was portrayed by William Devane in the 1991 American television miniseries A Woman Named Jackie.

Bouvier was portrayed by Fred Ward in the TV film biography Jackie Bouvier Kennedy Onassis in 2000.
