= Auchincloss =

- Pronunciation: /ˈɔkənklɑs/

Origin
- Meaning: "stone field" (a place-name)
- Region of origin: Scotland

Other names
- Variant form: Auchinclose

Auchincloss is a surname of Scottish origin, derived from an area in Ayrshire known as Auchincloich, which is Scottish Gaelic for "field of stones" from achadh ("field") and clach ("stone"). It is also the name of a prominent American family with kinship to the Kennedy family.

== Notable people ==
Notable people with the surname include:

- Charles Crooke Auchincloss (1881–1961), American lawyer and stockbroker; brother of James C. and nephew of Hugh D. Sr.
- Hugh D. Auchincloss (1897–1976), American stockbroker, lawyer, and stepfather of former First Lady of the United States Jacqueline Kennedy Onassis (by marriage to her mother, Janet Lee Bouvier); son of Hugh D. Sr.
- Hugh Auchincloss, Jr. (born 1949), American immunologist and physician-scientist; great nephew of Charles C. and James C.
- Hugh D. Auchincloss Sr. (1858–1913), American merchant and businessman, father of Hugh D. and uncle of Charles C. and James C.
- Jake Auchincloss (born 1988), American politician, son of Hugh Jr.
- James C. Auchincloss (1885–1976), American businessman and politician; brother of Charles C. Auchincloss and nephew of Hugh D. Sr.
- Lily van Ameringen Auchincloss (1922–2008), American journalist, philanthropist, art collector and daughter-in-law of James C.
- Louis Stanton Auchincloss (1917–2010), American lawyer, novelist, historian, essayist and first cousin, once removed, of Hugh D.
- Murray Auchincloss (born 1970), Canadian business executive

== See also ==
- Auchinleck, a name with a similar meaning, but derived from a different word for "stone": leac ("slab").
- Agnes Barr Auchencloss (1886–1972), medical officer at H.M. Factory Gretna, on the University of Glasgow Roll of Honour.
- Hugh Auchincloss Brown, electrical engineer for advancing the cataclysmic pole shift hypothesis, member of the extended Auchincloss family through his mother, Matilda Auchincloss (1824–1894), sister of John L. Auchincloss (1810–1876), and daughter of the family patriarch Hugh Auchincloss (1780–1855).
- Hugh Auchincloss (disambiguation)
