= Hugh Auchincloss =

Hugh Auchincloss may refer to:

- Hugh D. Auchincloss Jr. (1897–1976), American merchant and businessman, step-father of U.S. first lady Jackie Bouvier Kennedy
- Hugh Auchincloss (immunologist) (born 1949), American immunologist
- Hugh D. Auchincloss Sr. (1858–1913), American merchant and businessman

== See also ==
- Hugh Auchincloss Brown (1879–1975), electrical engineer
- Hugh Auchincloss Steers (1962–1995), American painter
