= Thomas Gore =

American politician (1870–1949)

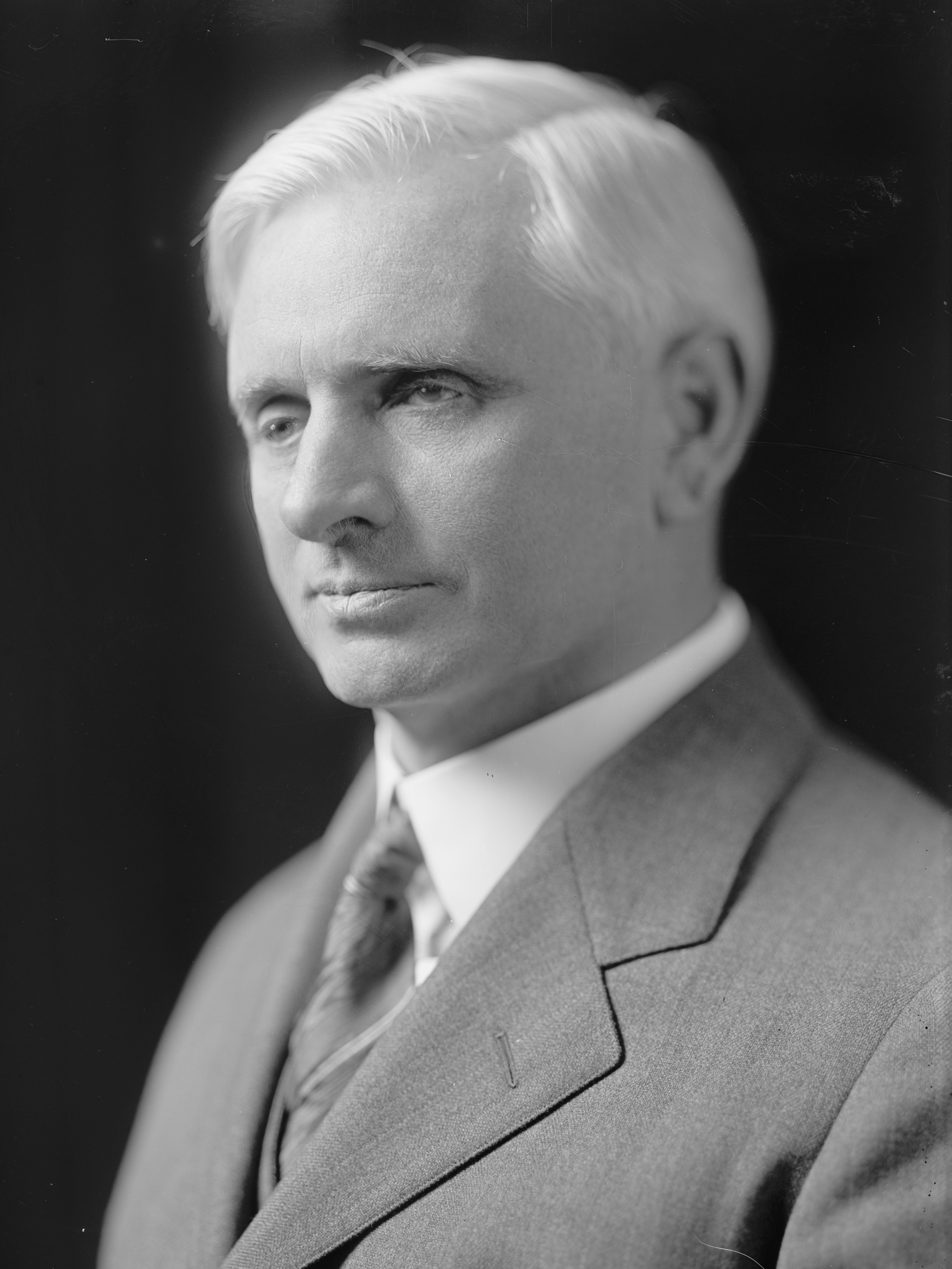
- Portrait by Harris & Ewing c. 1931–1937

United States Senator from Oklahoma
- In office March 4, 1931 – January 3, 1937
- Preceded by: William B. Pine
- Succeeded by: Joshua B. Lee
- In office December 11, 1907 – March 4, 1921
- Preceded by: Statehood granted
- Succeeded by: John W. Harreld

Member of the Oklahoma Territorial Council from the 11th district
- In office 1902–1905
- Preceded by: George H. Coulson
- Succeeded by: James Menefee

Personal details
- Born: Thomas Pryor Gore; December 10, 1870 Webster County, Mississippi, U.S.
- Died: March 16, 1949 (aged 78) Washington, D.C., U.S.
- Party: People's Party (1892–1899); Democratic (after 1899)
- Spouse: Nina Belle Kay (m. 1900)
- Children: Nina S. Gore; Thomas N. Gore
- Relatives: Gore Vidal (grandson); Nina Gore Auchincloss (granddaughter); Hugh Auchincloss Steers (great-grandson); Burr Steers (great-grandson)
- Education: Cumberland University

Thomas Pryor Gore (December 10, 1870 – March 16, 1949) was an American politician who served as one of the first two United States senators from Oklahoma, from 1907 to 1921 and again from 1931 to 1937. He first entered politics as an activist for the Populist Party, and continued this affiliation after he moved to Texas. In 1899, just before moving to Oklahoma Territory to practice law in Lawton, he formally joined the Democratic Party and campaigned for William Jennings Bryan. In the Senate, his anti-war beliefs caused him conflict with Democratic presidents Woodrow Wilson and Franklin D. Roosevelt.

Gore lost his eyesight during his youth. He was the maternal grandfather of noted author Gore Vidal.

== Early life ==
Gore was born on December 10, 1870, near Embry, Mississippi in Webster County, (Note: Webster County was then known as Sumner County.) the son of Caroline Elizabeth (née Wingo) and Thomas Madison Gore. The Gore family was one of the nineteen original families who owned farmlands in what later became the capital of the United States, the District of Columbia. The Gores were Anglo-Irish from Donegal and arrived in North America at the end of the seventeenth century and tended to intermarry with other Anglo-Irish families, particularly in Virginia. When the District was established in 1790, the families that had been dispossessed to make way for the capital city, including the Gores, reaped significant financial rewards. The Gores who remained either sold their land in lots, built homes or hotels, and all became rich. The Gores who moved away, including the branch of Thomas Pryor Gore, moved to the far West, which in those days was Mississippi. Young Thomas and his family moved to Walthall, the county seat, when his father was elected Chancery Clerk of Sumner County.

He went blind as a child through two separate accidents (Note: Thomas was eight years old when he injured his left eye and lost his right eye three years later. He was totally blind before he was twenty years old.) but did not give up his dream of becoming a senator. Despite his blindness, he excelled in school and showed special talents in debate and oratory.

== Career ==
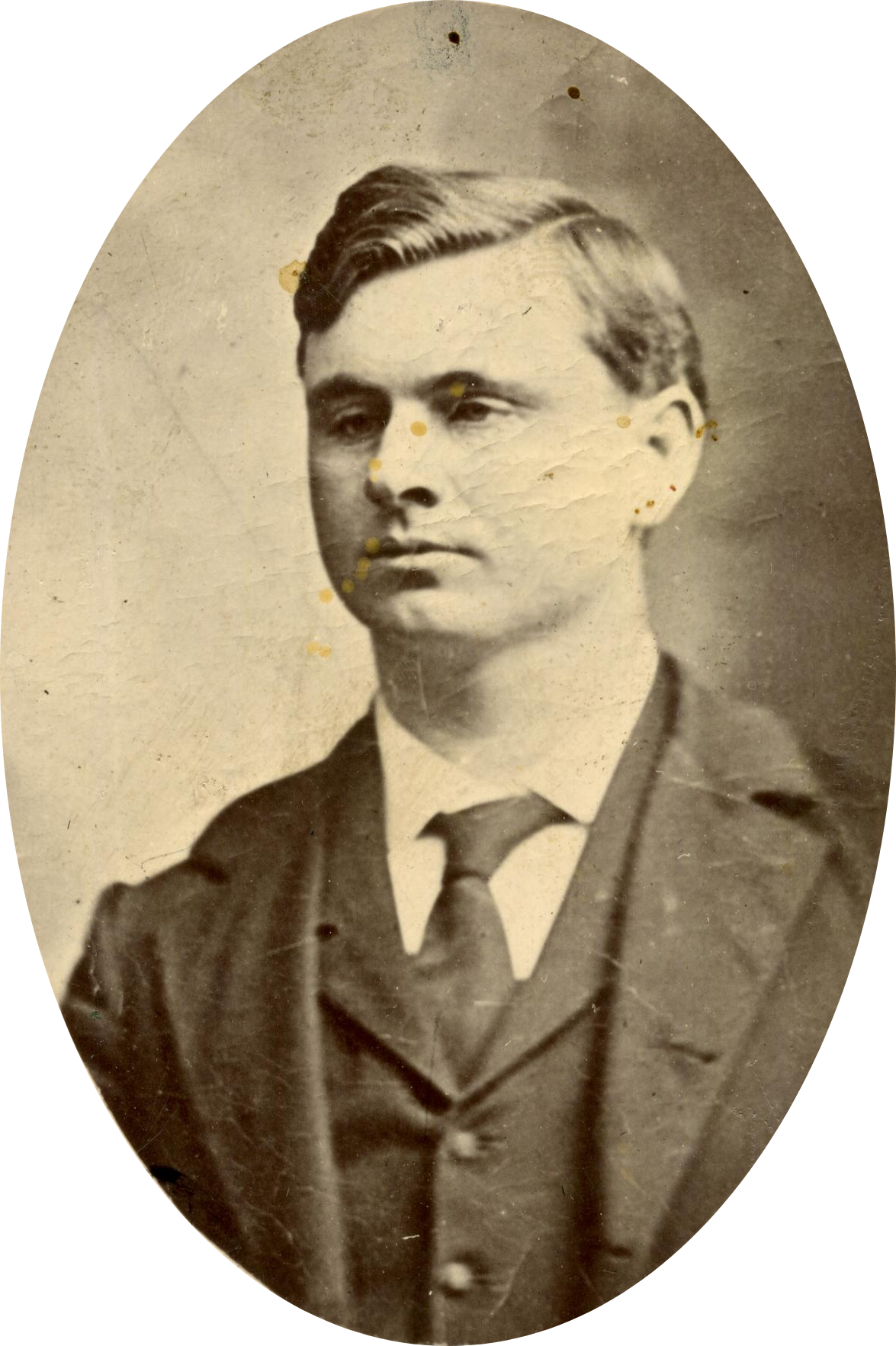
Gore in his youth

He taught school briefly after graduation. In 1882, he served as a page in the Mississippi Senate. He moved to Lebanon, Tennessee in 1891, and received a law degree from Cumberland University Law School in the following year. He was admitted to the Mississippi Bar and joined his father's law firm in Mississippi.

=== Populist Party politics ===
The Gore family had been prominent members of the Southern Farmers' Alliance. Young Thomas was addressing Alliance meetings as early as 1888. The Alliance nominated him for the state legislature, but he had to withdraw because he was still a minor. Instead he served as a presidential elector for the Populist party in 1892. This experience expanded his reputation as an orator. In 1894, the Populist party of Navarro County, Texas invited him to come to Corsicana to help them win elections. He and his brother, Ellis, moved there in December, 1894, where they opened a law office. Meanwhile, he returned to Mississippi to run for the legislature in 1895, a race which he lost. He campaigned vigorously from Utah to New York for William Jennings Bryan, the Democratic candidate for president in 1900.

Returning to Texas, he ran as a Populist candidate for the 6th Congressional District in 1898, but lost because the party was already in decline. He served as a delegate to the Populist convention that year, but in 1899, formally joined the Democratic Party.

=== Democratic Party politics ===
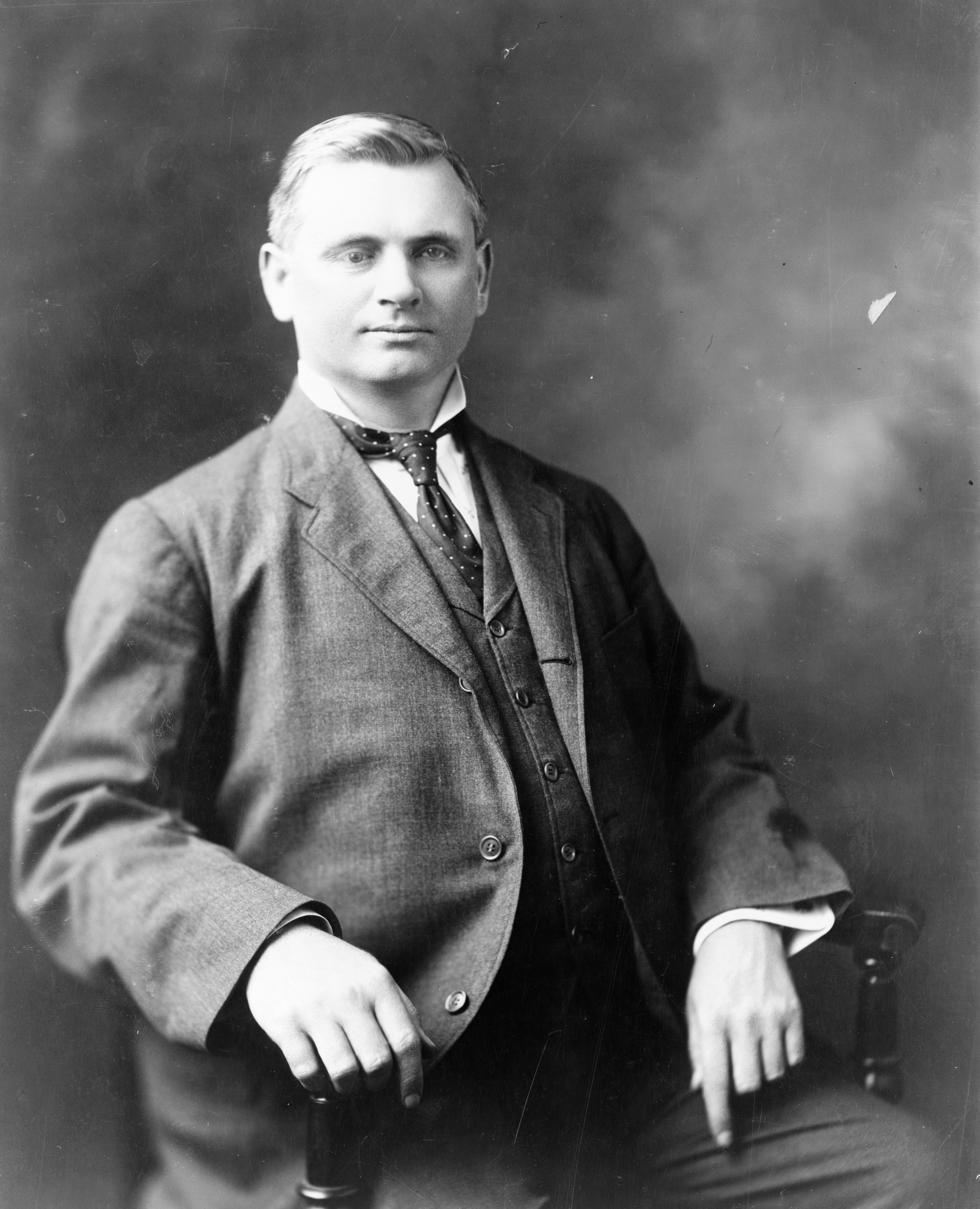
Gore in 1908

After marrying Nina Kay in December 1900, the Gores moved to Lawton, in Oklahoma Territory. In 1902, he entered and won an election for the Oklahoma Territorial Senate. He declined an opportunity to run as a territorial representative for the U. S, Congress, but became an adviser to the 1907 Constitutional Convention, then was elected to the U. S. Senate in 1907.

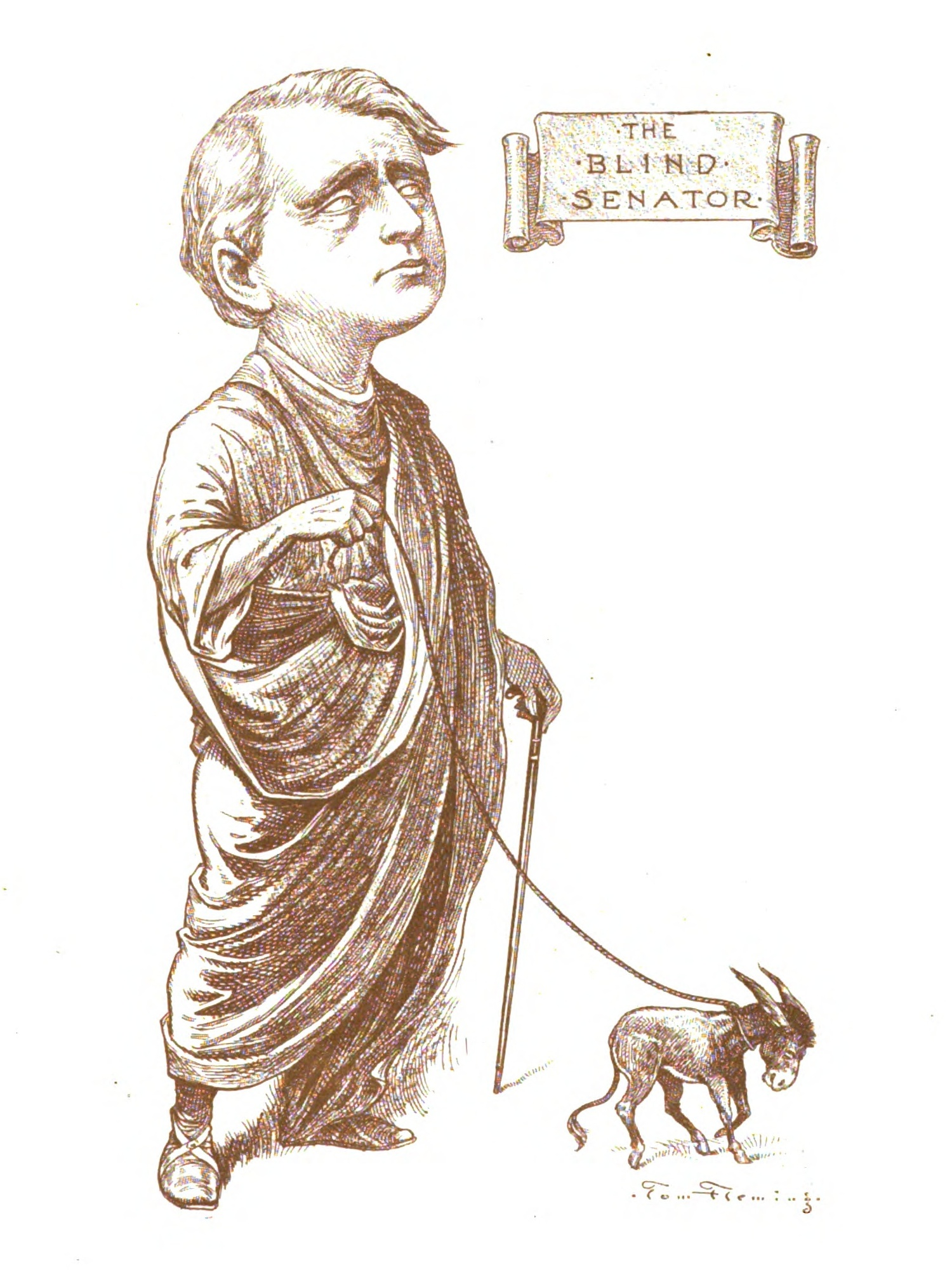
"The Blind Senator," caricature by Tom Fleming, 1914

In 1907, he was elected to the Senate as one of the first two senators from the new state of Oklahoma. He was re-elected in 1908 and 1914 but lost his seat in 1920. Gore and William H. "Alfalfa Bill" Murray were co-leaders of Woodrow Wilson's Oklahoma campaign for the Presidency in 1912. He was known as a member of the progressive wing of the Democratic Party, who supported many of Wilson's domestic programs, and worked well with Republicans such as Robert La Follette. He was to a large extent no different from any other politician because of his blindness, but there were problems, as La Follette recounts an example in his memoirs when, during a filibuster, Gore did not realize that the senator who was to take over speaking for him had left the room, and the filibuster failed because he did not continue to speak. Also, some of Gore's colleagues in the Senate would attempt to take advantage of Gore's blindness by tricking him into signing documents that it was not in his party's interest for him to sign. He was famous for turning the tables on these sharp dealers and tricking them into signing documents that they did not intend to sign. These exploits made him popular with the press, who dubbed him "The Blind Cowboy."

In 1910, he accused lobbyist Jake L. Hamon Sr., of trying to bribe him.

In 1914, a woman stated that Gore had "taken advantage" of her in a hotel room. When prosecutors declined to file charges against the senator, the woman filed a civil suit against him. The jury sided with Gore, and the woman lost her suit.

Gore was a pacifist and an anti-interventionist who campaigned against militarism, and loudly and vociferously condemned the malefactors of wealth as being the impetus for pushing America towards war; though he was often referred to as an isolationist. He voted against the Wilson Administration on most legislation pertaining to World War I. However, a majority of Oklahoma voters favored helping the Allies fight Germany. After the war, he also opposed Wilson's plan to support a League of Nations. Not only did Gore alienate many previous supporters, but he also lost his close relationship with Wilson. Thus, he lost his bid for reelection in 1920. After leaving the Senate, he returned to his private law practice full-time in Washington D.C.

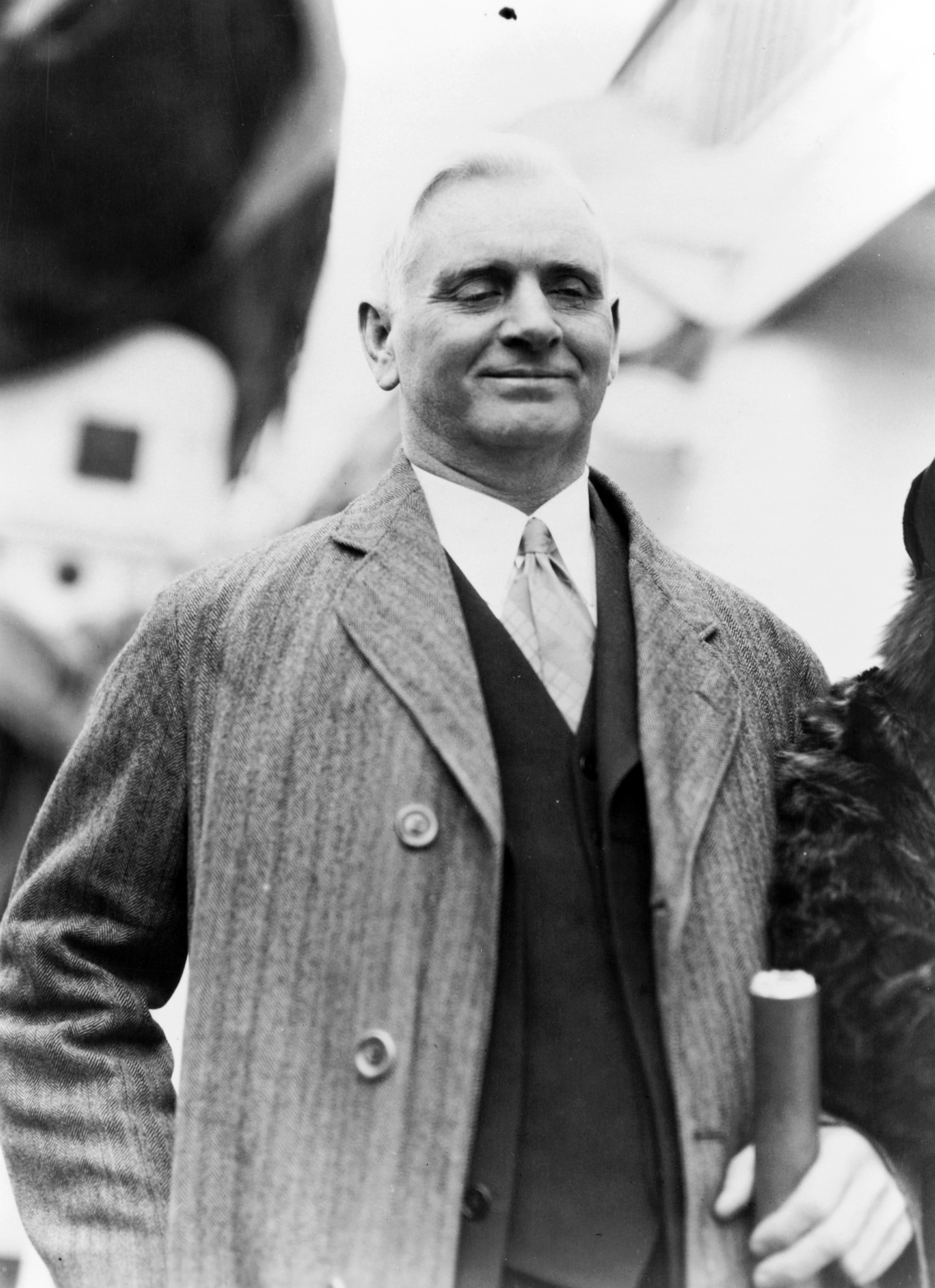
Gore in 1929

During the early stages of World War I, he co-authored the Gore-McLemore Resolutions to encourage American citizens not to travel aboard merchant vessels of countries participating in the war. The merchant vessels were under threat of attack by German U-boats, and the Senator felt the loss of American lives in attacks upon these boats put American neutrality at risk. He was a strong, early supporter of Woodrow Wilson's, indeed, one acknowledged as the very first major elected official to endorse Wilson's candidacy for president in 1911. Yet Gore later opposed America's entry into the war even after American involvement began. He unsuccessfully opposed providing manpower for the military by conscription, saying it would create "an army of conscripted slackers." He asked: "Why should we brand the American boy as a conscript without affording him the opportunity to earn the glory of an American volunteer?" This was the principal cause of Gore's defeat in the Democratic primary in 1920 by Congressman Scott Ferris, who was in turn defeated in the general election by Republican John W. Harreld. In addition to his opposition to the draft, Gore "was one of the earliest and most vigorous sponsors of a constitutional amendment to require a popular referendum on any congressional declaration of war." On domestic policy he was a supporter of the interests of farmers and Native Americans.

Gore was re-elected to the Senate in 1930. When Franklin D. Roosevelt took office as President, Gore at first supported his New Deal policies but later feuded with him. In 1935, Gore helped lead the charge against funding the Works Progress Administration (WPA). In written response to constituents who favored the WPA, he told them that their attitude "shows how the dole spoils the soul. Your telegram intimates that your votes are for sale. Much as I value votes I am not in the market. I cannot consent to buy votes with the people's money. I owe a debt to the taxpayer as well as to the unemployed." After dictating these words, the blind senator was led to the Senate floor to cast the lone vote against the WPA.

Gore ran for re-election in 1936, but was overwhelmingly defeated in the Democratic primary. He took 18% of the vote and ended up in fourth place, behind Congressman Joshua B. Lee, Governor E. W. Marland, and attorney Gomer Smith. Lee ultimately won the primary against Marland in a runoff.

Gore retired from the Senate in January 1937 and practiced law in Washington, D.C., until his death in 1949.

== Personal life ==
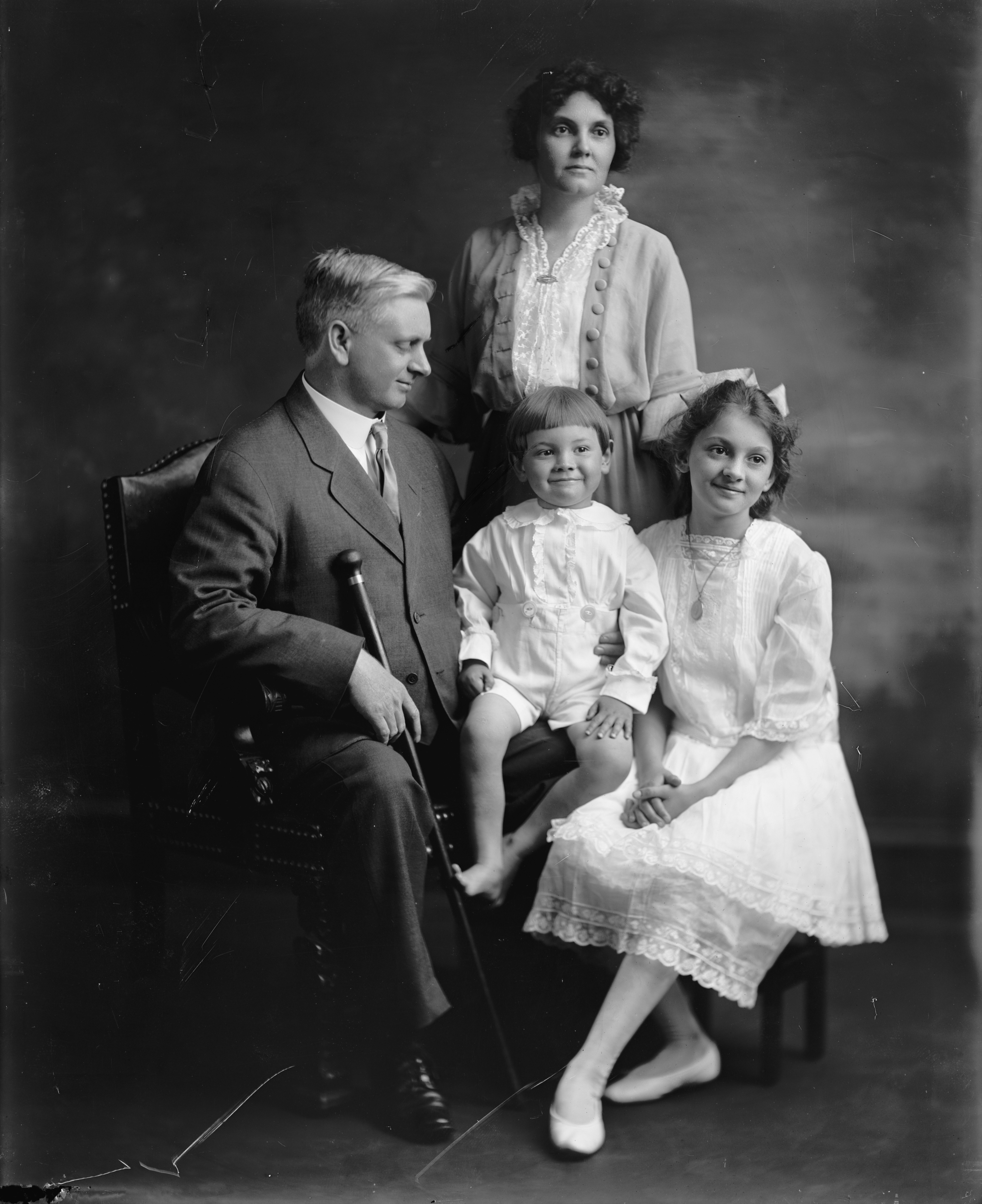
Gore with his family c. 1910s

Thomas married Nina Belle Kay (1877–1963), a Texas plantation owner's daughter, on December 27, 1900. She was described as his "constant companion" and as his "eyes." They moved to Lawton, Oklahoma in June 1901. They had two children:

- Nina S. Gore (1903–1978), who married Eugene Luther Vidal (1895–1969) in 1922. They divorced in 1935, and later that year, she married Hugh D. Auchincloss. They divorced in 1941.
- Thomas Notley Gore (1910–1965)

Gore died on March 16, 1949; he was buried at Rosehill Cemetery, Oklahoma City, Oklahoma, but was later re-interred on July 19, 1949, in Fairlawn Cemetery, also in Oklahoma City. According to his grandson, Gore Vidal, Gore was "the first and, I believe, last senator from an oil state to die without a fortune."

Gore Vidal stated that his grandfather was an atheist and had a strong misanthropic streak: "He was a genuine populist; but he did not like people very much. He always said no to anyone who wanted government aid." During a speech to the National Press Club on November 4, 1994, Vidal claimed that Thomas Gore had said "If there was any race other than the human race, I'd go join it."

=== Descendants ===
Through his daughter he was the grandfather of writer Gore Vidal (1925–2012), Nina Gore Auchincloss (born 1937), who was married to Newton Steers from 1957 to 1974, and then Michael Straight from 1974 to 1998, and Thomas Gore Auchincloss (born 1939) who married Diana "Didi" Lippert.

=== Honors ===
Thomas Gore was inducted into the Oklahoma Hall of Fame in 1932.

A major road artery in Lawton, Oklahoma, Gore Boulevard, is named after him, as is the eastern Oklahoma town of Gore.

== Notes ==
Party political offices
First	Democratic nominee for U.S. Senator from Oklahoma (Class 3); 1914	Succeeded by Scott Ferris
Preceded by Jack C. Walton	Democratic nominee for U.S. Senator from Oklahoma (Class 2); 1930	Succeeded by Joshua B. Lee
U.S. Senate
Preceded by None	U.S. senator (Class 3) from Oklahoma; 1907–1921; Served alongside: Robert L. Owen	Succeeded by John W. Harreld
Preceded by William B. Pine	U.S. senator (Class 2) from Oklahoma; 1931–1937; Served alongside: Elmer Thomas	Succeeded by Joshua B. Lee
