= Nina S. Gore =

American actress and socialite

Nina S. Olds
- Born: Nina S. Gore; July 25, 1903; Lawton, Oklahoma, U.S.
- Died: April 3, 1978 (aged 74); New York City, U.S.
- Other names: Nina Gore; Nina Vidal; Nina Auchincloss; Nina Olds
- Spouses: Eugene Luther Vidal (m. 1922; div. 1935) Hugh Dudley Auchincloss, Jr. (m. 1935; div. 1941) Robert Olds (m. 1942; died 1943)
- Children: Gore Vidal; Nina Auchincloss Straight; Thomas Gore Auchincloss
- Parent(s): Thomas Gore; Nina Belle Kay

Nina S. Olds (née Gore; July 25, 1903 – April 3, 1978) was an American actress and socialite known for her three marriages, to Eugene Vidal, Hugh D. Auchincloss, and Robert Olds, as well as her children, authors Gore Vidal and Nina Auchincloss.

== Early life ==
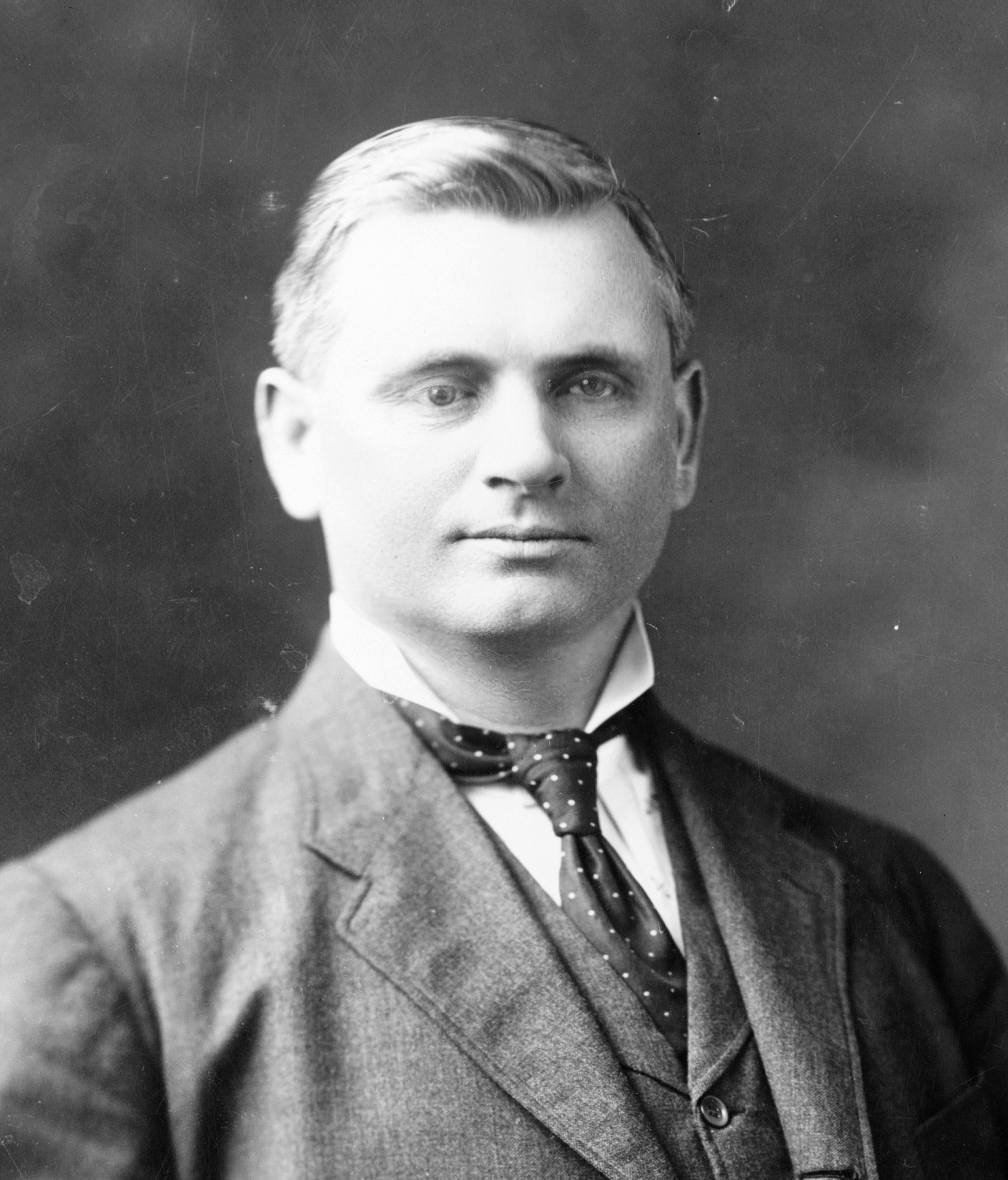
Nina's father, U.S. Senator Thomas Gore

Nina S. Gore was born on July 25, 1903, to U.S. Senator Thomas Gore (1870–1949) and his wife Nina Belle Kay (1877–1963), a Texas plantation owner's daughter. She had a younger brother, Thomas Notley Gore (1910–1964). Her father, who lost his eyesight during his youth, was said to have been an atheist and had a strong misanthropic streak. Nina's son would later write that "he was a genuine populist, but he did not like people very much. He always said no to anyone who wanted government aid." He was claimed to have said "If there was any race other than the human race, I'd go join it." Thomas Gore died in 1949.

== Life and Personality ==
In 1928, Gore made her Broadway debut in Sign of the Leopard, which opened at the National Theatre. In 1940, Nina, an alternate delegate from Virginia to the Democratic convention announced her support of Wendell Willkie over Roosevelt.

From 1925 until 1950, she lived in Washington, D.C. She later split her time between Cuernavaca, Mexico, and Southampton, New York. In the seven years preceding her death, she lived in San Antonio, Texas.

Nina was known as a vivacious, quixotic, and unpredictable person. Her son Gore referred to her as an alcoholic and "certifiably insane," as she likely suffered from bipolar disorder. She was candid about her sexual exploits and was said to have had an affair with John Hay Whitney in the early 1930s while he was married to Liz Whitney Tippett, at the same time Liz had an affair with Nina Vidal's husband, Eugene Vidal. Nina also had "a long off-and-on affair" with the actor Clark Gable. She was also described thus:

"When she enters a room you feel here comes everything fresh, healthy, and beautiful. Her skin glows warmly and her huge brown eyes are bright. An outdoor woman, she is full of indoor charm. Rides every day of her life."

Gore was glamorous and has been described as a flighty mother with an apparent lack of maternal interest in her children. Her son, Gore Vidal, would later say about his mother, "We rarely got into a conversation. It was pointless. She didn’t see me. I wished I didn’t see her."

In 1949, she loaned Gore $3,000 toward the purchase of Edgewater, his estate on the Hudson River.

== Personal life ==
In 1922, Gore married Eugene Luther Vidal, an American commercial aviation pioneer. Because her father was ill and couldn't attend, U.S. Representative William A. Rodenberg walked her down the aisle. They divorced in 1935. Together, they had one child:

- Gore Vidal (1925-2012), the writer.

In 1935, Nina married Hugh Dudley Auchincloss, Jr. (1897-1976), the son of Hugh Dudley Auchincloss, Sr., a merchant and financier, and Emma Brewster Jennings. Hugh had previously been married to Maya de Chrapovitsky, a Russian noblewoman, from 1925 to 1932. Hugh and Maya had one child, Hugh Dudley Auchincloss III. Together, Nina and Hugh had two children:

- Nina Auchincloss (born 1937), who married Newton Steers in 1957, after having briefly dated Ted Kennedy. They divorced in 1974 when she married Michael Whitney Straight, a member of the Whitney family who was a publisher and novelist. Straight was the son of Willard Dickerman Straight, an investment banker who died in Michael's infancy, and Dorothy Payne Whitney, a philanthropist. They divorced in 1998.
- Thomas Gore Auchincloss (born 1939), married Diana Lippert (b. 1940) in 1960. She was the daughter of Bernhard G. Lippert, the former German Vice Consul in the U.S.

Hugh and Nina divorced in 1941. Hugh remarried Janet Lee Bouvier, the mother of future First Lady Jacqueline Lee "Jackie" Bouvier and Caroline Lee Bouvier. Hugh and Janet had two children together, Janet Jennings Auchincloss and James Lee Auchincloss.

In June 1942, Nina remarried for the third and final time to Robert Olds (1896-1943). Robert died of pneumonia on April 28, 1943, after hospitalization for constrictive pericarditis and Libman-Sacks endocarditis, at the age of 46, just before his son Robin Olds' graduation from West Point.

Nina died on April 3, 1978, in New York City at the Memorial Sloan-Kettering Hospital after a long illness.

=== Descendants ===
Olds was the grandmother of Hugh Auchincloss Steers (1963–1995), an artist and Burr Gore Steers (born 1965), a filmmaker.
