= Gore Vidal: The United States of Amnesia =

- Film poster
- Directed by: Nicholas D. Wrathall
- Produced by: Nicholas Wrathall, Michael Barnett, Andrew Kortschak, Walter Kortschak, Burr Steers
- Starring: Gore Vidal
- Cinematography: Joel Schwarzburg, Derek Weidenhahn, Armando Death
- Edited by: Suresh Ayyar, Rob Bralver, William Haugse
- Music by: Ian Honeyman
- Production companies: Amnesia Productions, Audax Films, End Cue, SuperFilms!
- Distributed by: IFC Films
- Release date: April 18, 2013 (Tribeca)
- Running time: 89 minutes

Gore Vidal: The United States of Amnesia is a 2013 documentary film about the life and career of author Gore Vidal. It premiered at Tribeca Film Festival in 2013.

== Synopsis ==
The film is a commentary on Vidal's professional and personal life, and the impact he had in art and politics. It includes exclusive interviews with Vidal, as well as figures such as Burr Steers and Christopher Hitchens.

== Cast ==
- Gore Vidal
- Jay Parini
- Burr Steers
- Christopher Hitchens
- Jodie Evans
- Tim Robbins
- Mikhail Gorbachev
- Sting
- David Mamet
- Bob Scheer
- William F. Buckley
- Jay Parini
- Norman Mailer
- Nina Straight
- Dick Cavett

== Reception ==
On review aggregator Rotten Tomatoes, the film holds an approval rating of 83% based on 29 reviews, with an average rating of 6.89/10. On Metacritic, the film has a weighted average score of 72 out of 100, based on 14 critics, indicating "generally favorable reviews".

== Awards ==
The film won the award of Best International Documentary Film at the 2014 Byron Bay Film Festival.

== Accolades ==
- Audience Award - Palm Springs International Film Festival
- Best Documentary - 16th United Nations Association Film Festival

=== Festival screenings ===
- Tribeca Film Festival (2013)
- Aspen Film Festival (2013)
- Traverse City Film Festival (2013)
- 16th United Nations Association Film Festival (2013)
