= Hugh D. Auchincloss Sr. =

American merchant and businessman (1858–1913)

- Born: Hugh Dudley Auchincloss; July 8, 1858; Newport, Rhode Island, U.S.
- Died: April 21, 1913 (aged 54); Manhattan, New York, U.S.
- Burial place: Oak Lawn Cemetery; Fairfield, Connecticut, U.S.
- Education: Yale University
- Spouse: Emma Brewster Jennings (m. 1891)
- Children: Esther Judson Blitz; Hugh D. Auchincloss Jr. Annie Burr Lewis
- Parent(s): John Auchincloss; Elizabeth Buck Auchincloss
- Relatives: See Auchincloss

Hugh Dudley Auchincloss Sr. (July 8, 1858 – April 21, 1913) was an American merchant and businessman who was prominent in New York society.

== Early life ==
Hugh Dudley Auchincloss Sr. was born on July 8, 1858, at his father's summer home in Newport, Rhode Island. He was a younger son of John Auchincloss (1810–1876) and Elizabeth (née Buck) Auchincloss (1816–1902). Among his seven siblings were Sarah Ann Auchincloss (wife of Sir James Coats, 1st Baronet), William Stuart Auchincloss, Edgar Stirling Auchincloss (who married Maria LaGrange Sloan), Frederic Lawton Auchincloss, and railroad executive John Winthrop Auchincloss (who married Joanna Hone Russell). His father was the senior member of John & Hugh Auchincloss. His first cousins included Hugh Auchincloss Brown, electrical engineer and advocate of the cataclysmic pole shift hypothesis.

His paternal grandparents were Ann Anthony (née Stuart) Auchincloss and Hugh Auchincloss, who emigrated from Paisley, Scotland in 1801 and became a merchant in 1805. His mother, a descendant of Massachusetts Bay Colony Gov. Thomas Dudley, was a daughter of Gurdon Buck and Susannah (née Manwaring) Buck who had a mansion in Liberty Street in Manhattan. His maternal uncle was Dr. Gurdon Buck. After preparing for college at the Collegiate Institute of Morris W. Lyon, Auchincloss graduated from Yale University in 1879 with a PhB.

== Career ==
Following his graduating from Yale, he began working for Muir & Duckerworth, cotton brokers in Savannah, Georgia, remaining with them for two years. In January 1882, he went into business with his brother John Winthrop Auchincloss, in the firm of Auchincloss Brothers (the business originally started by his grandfather and was known as John & Hugh Auchincloss.), as dry goods commission merchants in New York City. Auchincloss retired from business in 1891 to "devote himself to managing private companies in mining, manufacturing, transportation, as well as banking and other interests." He was also a director of the Farmers' Loan and Trust Company, the Bank of the Manhattan Company, the Bowery Savings Bank, and the Consolidated Gas Company.

Auchincloss was a member of the Yale Alumni Association, the University Club of New York, the Metropolitan Club, the New York Yacht Club, the Century Association, and the New England Society and Saint Andrew's Society.

== Personal life ==
On November 19, 1891, Auchincloss was married to heiress Emma Brewster Jennings (1861–1942), a daughter of Oliver Burr Jennings, one of the original stockholders in Standard Oil. Together, they were the parents of three children, two daughters and a son:

- Esther Judson Auchincloss (1895–1986), who married Edmund Witherell Nash (1896–1947) in 1917. They divorced in 1929, and she married Norman Blitz in 1930.
- Hugh Dudley Auchincloss Jr. (1897–1976), who married Maria Nikolayevna de Chrapovitsky (1899–1990) in 1925. They divorced in 1932, and he married Nina S. Gore (1903–1978) in 1935. They too divorced in 1941 and he married Janet Lee Bouvier (1907–1989), mother of Lee Radziwill and Jacqueline Kennedy Onassis, in 1942.
- Annie Burr Auchincloss (1902–1959), who married Wilmarth Sheldon Lewis (1895–1979) in 1928.

Auchincloss died at 33 East 67th Street, his home in Manhattan on April 21, 1913, and was buried at Oak Lawn Cemetery in Fairfield, Connecticut. His widow died in 1942. His widow's $5,000,000 estate was divided among their three children.

=== Descendants ===
Through his son Hugh, he was a grandfather of Nina Gore Auchincloss (b. 1937) and Janet Jennings Auchincloss (1945–1985).
