= Dorothy Straight =

American author (born 1958)

- Born: Dorothy Elmhirst Straight; May 25, 1958 (age 68); Washington, D.C.
- Known for: Youngest author
- Works: How the World Began
- Parent(s): Michael Whitney Straight; Belinda Booth Crompton
- Relatives: Willard D. Straight (grandfather); Dorothy Payne Whitney (grandmother)

Dorothy Elmhirst Straight (born May 25, 1958) is an American author who wrote How the World Began in 1962 at the age of 4 for her grandmother, Dorothy Payne Whitney, making her among the youngest published authors in history.

== Early life ==
Dorothy Straight was born on May 25, 1958, in Washington, D.C. She is the daughter of Michael Whitney Straight (1916–2004) and Belinda Booth Crompton (1920–2015). Her siblings include David Straight, Michael Straight Jr., Susan Straight, and Dinah Straight.

Straight was named after her paternal grandmother, Dorothy Payne Whitney (1887–1968), the daughter of William Collins Whitney, the U.S. Secretary of the Navy during the Cleveland administration, and Flora Payne, the daughter of Senator Henry B. Payne of Ohio and sister of Col. Oliver Hazard Payne. Straight's paternal grandfather was Willard Dickerman Straight (1880–1918), the son of Henry Harrison Straight (1846–1886). After her grandfather died of influenza during the 1918 pandemic, while serving with the United States Army in France during World War I, her grandmother married Leonard Knight Elmhirst (1893–1974). Her father's siblings included Whitney Willard Straight and Beatrice Whitney Straight, an Academy Award winning actress. Her maternal grandmother, Lillian Crompton Tobey, was the widow of U.S. Senator Charles Tobey (1880–1953).

== Career ==
In 1962, Straight, in response to her mother's question of "Who made the world?", wrote and drew her response all in one evening. Her parents loved it so much that they sent it to Pantheon Books which published it in 1964, making her the youngest published author. Kirkus Reviews praised her work as a child, writing:

Her art work is in the mainstream of the Kindergarten approach to paint and paper -- totally refreshing use of color and a wild approximation of shape. Her concept of God's activities during the Creation are nothing if not complete -- after inventing the jungle and its wild animals, he went on to pins and thread, birds and bees. The importance children place on the familiar and the furniture of their surroundings comes through in Dorothy's words and pictures.

== See also ==
- Whitney family
