= Aircraft Research BT-11 =

XBT-11

General information
- Type: Trainer aircraft
- Manufacturer: Aircraft Research Corp
- Status: Cancelled
- Primary user: United States Army Air Corps
- Number built: 0

The Aircraft Research XBT-11 was to have been a basic trainer constructed by the Aircraft Research Corporation (formerly the Vidal Research Corporation) of Bendix, New Jersey, by molding "Weldwood", a "plastic" plywood composite material made of heat and pressure-processed phenol phenol-formaldehyde resins and wood similar to the Duramold process. The Duramold and Haskelite processes were first developed in 1937, followed by Eugene L. Vidal's Weldwood in 1938. A production contract, proposed in 1940, was cancelled before any were built.

== Specifications ==
Data from

General characteristics

- Crew: 2
- Length: 27 ft 6 in (8.38 m)
- Wingspan: 42 ft (13 m)
- Gross weight: 4,431 lb (2,010 kg)
- Powerplant: 1 × Pratt & Whitney R-985-25 radial engine, 450 hp (340 kW)

Performance

- Maximum speed: 169 mph (272 km/h, 147 kn)

== See also ==
- Timm PT-160 A wood composite trainer.
