= Anne Morrow Lindbergh: First Lady of the Air =

2006 book by Kathleen Winters

- Author: Kathleen Winters
- Language: English
- Subject: Anne Morrow Lindbergh
- Genre: biography
- Publisher: St. Martin's Griffin
- Publication date: November 1, 2006
- Publication place: United States
- Pages: 256
- ISBN: 1-4039-6932-9

Anne Morrow Lindbergh: First Lady of the Air is a biography about the American aviator and writer Anne Morrow Lindbergh, written by Kathleen Winters and published by St. Martin's Griffin in 2006. It focuses on Anne's activity in aviation, collaborating with her husband Charles Lindbergh and working as co-pilot, navigator and radio operator.

Kirkus Reviews called the book "a perfectly calibrated tribute to an early heroine of the air".
