= Burr Steers =

American actor, writer, film director

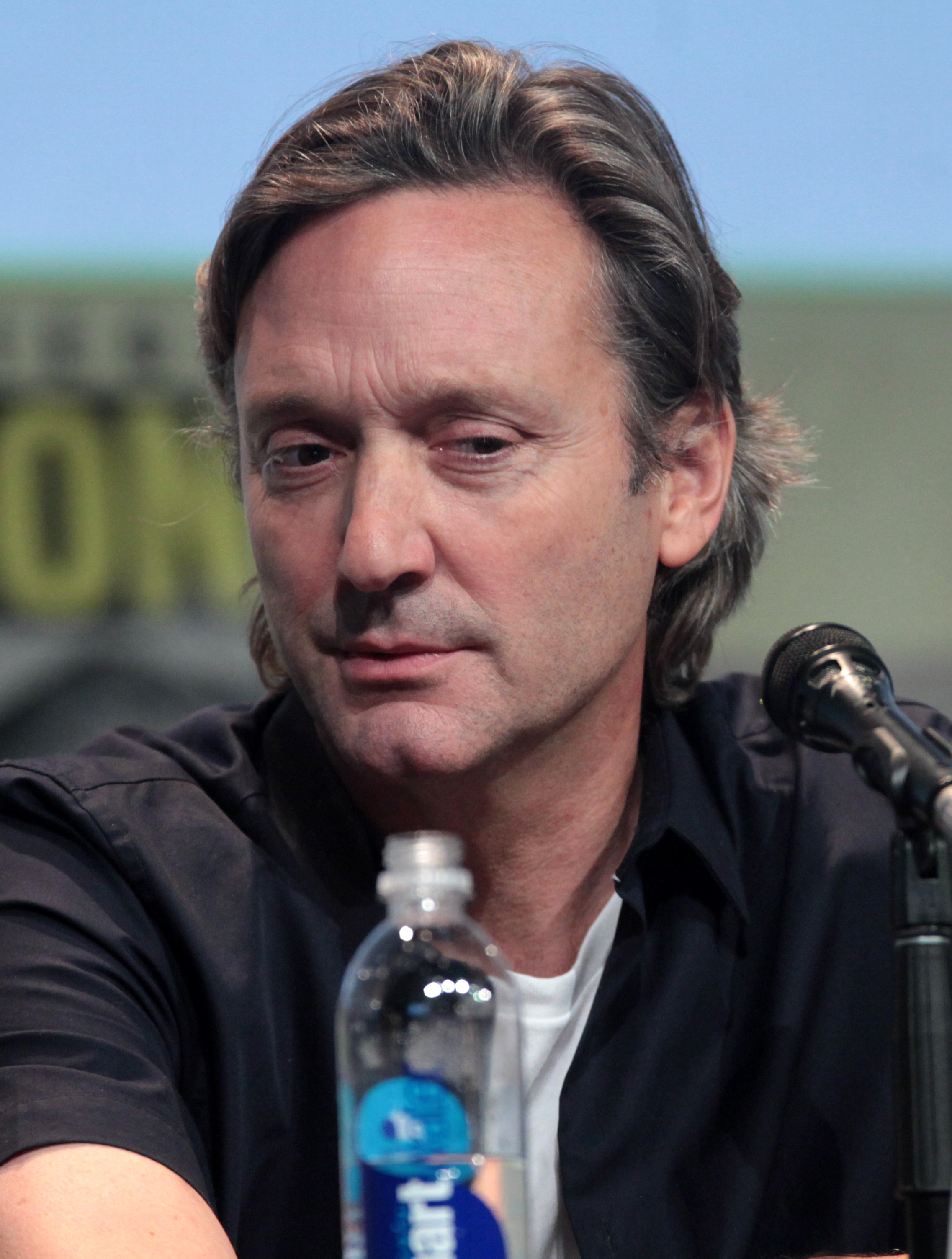
- Steers at ComicCon 2015
- Born: Burr Gore Steers; October 8, 1965 (age 61); Washington, D.C., US
- Education: St. Albans School; Hotchkiss School; Culver Military Academy
- Alma mater: New York University
- Occupations: Film director, screenwriter, actor
- Parent(s): Newton Steers; Nina Gore Auchincloss
- Relatives: Hugh Auchincloss Steers (brother); Gore Vidal (half-uncle); Hugh D. Auchincloss (grandfather); Nina S. Gore (grandmother); Thomas Gore (great-grandfather)

Burr Gore Steers (born October 8, 1965) is an American actor, screenwriter, and director. His films include Igby Goes Down (2002) and 17 Again (2009). He is a nephew of writer Gore Vidal.

== Early life and education ==
Steers was born in Washington, D.C. His father, Newton Ivan Steers, Jr. (1917–1993), was a businessman and politician who briefly served as a Republican congressman from Maryland. Through his mother, Nina Gore Auchincloss (born 1937), he is a grandson of stockbroker and lawyer Hugh D. Auchincloss, a cousin of Louis Auchincloss. Nina is also the stepsister of Jacqueline Kennedy Onassis and younger half-sister of the writer Gore Vidal. Steers is a relative of vice president Aaron Burr, the third Vice President of the United States. Steers's great-grandfather Thomas Gore served as Oklahoma's first Democratic senator, from 1907 until 1921 and from 1931 until 1937, while his great-great-grandfather Oliver Burr Jennings was a founder of Standard Oil. Steers's godfather was former Virginia Senator John Warner.

His brother Hugh Auchincloss Steers (1963–1995) was an American figurative painter whose later works often focused on AIDS as a theme. He has another brother, Ivan Steers, and five stepsiblings from his mother's second marriage to editor Michael Whitney Straight.

Steers grew up living in Bethesda, Maryland and Georgetown, Washington, D.C., where he attended St. Albans School. Steers was expelled from both the Hotchkiss School and Culver Military Academy. He eventually earned his GED and attended New York University.

== Career ==
Steers has had minor roles in a few of Quentin Tarantino's films, playing Roger (or "Flock of Seagulls") in Pulp Fiction and providing one of the radio voices in Reservoir Dogs. He also has appeared in The Last Days of Disco, Fix and Gore Vidal's Billy the Kid.

He wrote and directed Igby Goes Down in 2002, a coming-of-age film that starred Kieran Culkin and Susan Sarandon. Steers also was the screenwriter of the film How to Lose a Guy in 10 Days, which starred Kate Hudson and Matthew McConaughey. He has directed episodes of the television series Weeds, The L Word, Big Love, and The New Normal. Steers also directed the 2009 teen comedy film, 17 Again starring Zac Efron.

In 2010 Steers directed the drama Charlie St. Cloud, also starring Efron. Also in 2010, there was media coverage for Steers having been hired to direct an epic film about the early life of Julius Caesar to be based on the novels by Conn Iggulden as adapted from the first two novels of Iggulden's series, The Gates of Rome and The Death of Kings, and covering the years from 92 BC to 71 BC. Exclusive Media Group hired Steers after having the adaptation written by William Broyles and Stephen Harrigan. Steers directed the 2016 film adaptation of the parody novel, Pride and Prejudice and Zombies.

== Filmography ==
=== Film ===
Year	Title	Director	Writer	Ref.
2002	Igby Goes Down	Yes	Yes	
2003	How to Lose a Guy in 10 Days		Yes	
2009	17 Again	Yes		
2010	Charlie St. Cloud	Yes		
2016	Pride and Prejudice and Zombies	Yes	Yes	

Acting roles

Year	Title	Role	Notes	Ref.
1989	Intruder	Bub		
1992	Reservoir Dogs	Background Radio Play	Voice Only	
1993	Naked in New York	Shipley		
1994	Pulp Fiction	Roger		
1998	Fix	Mitch		
1998	The Last Days of Disco	Van		
2013	Gore Vidal: The United States of Amnesia	Himself	Also co-producer	

=== Television ===
Director

Year	Title	Notes	Ref.
2005	The L Word	Episode "Labyrinth"	
2005	Weeds	Episode "Fashion of the Christ"	
2007	Big Love	Episode "Vision Thing"	
2012	The New Normal	Episode "Para-New Normal Activity"	
2018	Elemental: Hydrogen Vs. Hindenburg	Miniseries	
2021	Chapelwaite	Episodes "Blood Calls Blood" and "Memento Mori"; Also executive producer	

Acting roles

Year	Title	Role	Notes	Ref.
1989	Billy the Kid	Billy Henchman	TV movie	
1990	The New Adam-12		Episode "The Killing"	
1990	Room for Romance		Episode "A Midsummer Night's Reality"	
1993	Silk Stalkings	Jason Lyons	Episode "Sex, Lies and Yellow Tape"	
