= Nina Auchincloss Straight =

American author, journalist and socialite

- Born: Nina Gore Auchincloss; January 10, 1937 (age 89); Washington, D.C., U.S.
- Education: Potomac School; Miss Porter's School
- Alma mater: Bryn Mawr College; Columbia University; American University
- Occupations: Author, journalist
- Spouses: Newton Ivan Steers, Jr. (m. 1957; div. 1974) Michael Whitney Straight (m. 1974; div. 1998)
- Children: Hugh Auchincloss Steers; Ivan Steers; Burr Steers
- Parent(s): Hugh D. Auchincloss Jr. Nina S. Gore
- Relatives: Gore Vidal (half-brother); Janet Auchincloss Rutherfurd (half-sister); Louis Auchincloss (cousin); Hugh D. Auchincloss Sr. (grandfather)

Nina Gore Auchincloss Straight (formerly Steers, born January 10, 1937) is an American author, journalist, and socialite. She is the mother of writer/director Burr Steers as well as artist Hugh Auchincloss Steers, and a half-sister of Gore Vidal.

== Early life ==
Nina Gore Auchincloss is the daughter of Hugh Dudley Auchincloss Jr. and Nina S. Gore. Her father was an American stockbroker and lawyer, and a cousin of the novelist and lawyer, Louis Auchincloss. Her father had previously been married to Maya de Chrapovitsky, a Russian noblewoman with whom he had one son, Hugh Dudley Auchincloss III. Her mother had previously been married to Eugene Luther Vidal, a commercial aviation pioneer, with whom she also had one son, the writer Gore Vidal. Hugh Jr. and Nina had married in 1935 and besides young Nina, the marriage produced one additional child, Thomas Gore Auchincloss. Young Nina's parents divorced in 1941, and a year later, Hugh remarried for the third and final time to Janet Lee Bouvier, in 1942. Janet was the mother of future First Lady Jacqueline Lee Bouvier and Caroline Lee Bouvier. Nina's father had two more children with Janet, half-siblings to young Nina, Janet Jennings Auchincloss and James Lee Auchincloss. Hugh and Janet remained married until his death in 1976. Also in 1942, Nina's mother remarried for the third and final time to Robert Olds, but only remained married a short time until Robert's early death of pneumonia in 1943, after hospitalization for constrictive pericarditis and Libman-Sacks endocarditis, at the age of 46, just prior to his son Robin Olds' graduation from West Point.

Nina's paternal grandparents were Hugh Dudley Auchincloss Sr., a merchant and financier, and Emma Brewster (née Jennings) Auchincloss, a daughter of Oliver Burr Jennings, one of the original stockholders in Standard Oil. Her maternal grandparents were U.S. Senator Thomas Gore and Nina Belle (née Kay) Gore.

=== Debutante ===
In 1955, Auchincloss made her debut at a formal ball given by her father and stepmother Janet (who lived in McLean, Virginia), at their summer home, Hammersmith Farm in Newport, Rhode Island. The ball was attended by over 700 guests. In 1957, she inherited a $225,000 (equivalent to $2,579,000 in 2025) trust.

== Education and career ==
Nina attended the Potomac School in Washington, D.C., and Miss Porter's School in Farmington, Connecticut. She attended and graduated from Bryn Mawr College, just outside of Philadelphia.

Nina subsequently attended and earned a master's degree in journalism from Columbia University in 1961. While she attended Columbia, she worked part-time for columnist Charles Bartlett. In 1964, she earned an M.A. in history from Columbia, her second degree from Columbia. From 1963 until 1971, Nina worked as Washington correspondent and bureau chief for the Chattanooga Times, while raising her three sons.

In 1981, her novel Ariabella: The First, was published by Random House. At the time, she was in her second year of evening law school at American University and was working on a biography of her maternal grandfather, Oklahoma Sen. Thomas Pryor Gore.

== Personal life ==
In 1957, Nina married Newton Ivan Steers, Jr., who was 20 years her senior. Jackie Kennedy was her matron of honor at the wedding and then Sen. John F. Kennedy was one of the groomsmen. During their marriage, Steers became a member of the Maryland State Senate. Together, they had three sons:

- Hugh Auchincloss Steers (1962–1995), a painter
- Ivan Steers
- Burr Gore Steers (born 1965), a writer and filmmaker.

Nina and Steers separated in 1972 and divorced in 1974. In 1976, Steers was elected to the U.S. House of Representatives from Maryland's 8th congressional district. Steers remarried to Inge Wirsich Irwin in 1978, to whom he remained married until his death in 1993.

In 1974, Nina married her second husband, Michael Whitney Straight, 21 years her senior and a member of the Whitney family who was a publisher and novelist. Straight was the son of Willard Dickerman Straight, an investment banker who died in Michael's infancy, and Dorothy Payne Whitney, a philanthropist. After his mother's remarriage to Leonard Knight Elmhirst, Straight lived in England. The wedding was attended by Janet Auchincloss, Jackie Kennedy, Renata Adler, Beatrice Straight, and Peter Cookson. Nina and Michael's marriage ended in divorce in 1998. He later married Katharine Gould, a child psychiatrist and art historian, to whom he remained married until his death in 2004.

== Published works ==
- Ariabella: The First (1981) ISBN 039449346X
