= Michael Straight =

American writer, publisher and Soviet spy (1916–2004)

- Born: Michael Whitney Straight; September 1, 1916; New York City, U.S.
- Died: January 4, 2004 (aged 87); Chicago, Illinois, U.S.
- Education: London School of Economics; Trinity College, Cambridge
- Spouses: Belinda Crompton (m. 1939; div. 1969) Nina Auchincloss Steers (m. 1974; div. 1998) Katharine Gould (m. 1998)
- Children: 5, including Dorothy
- Parent(s): Willard D. Straight; Dorothy Payne Whitney
- Relatives: Whitney Straight (brother); Beatrice Straight (sister)

Michael Whitney Straight (September 1, 1916 – January 4, 2004) was an American magazine publisher, novelist, patron of the arts, a member of the prominent Whitney family, and a confessed spy for the KGB.

== Early life ==
Straight was born in New York City, the son of Willard Dickerman Straight (1880–1918), an investment banker who died in Michael's infancy, and Dorothy Payne Whitney (1887–1968), a philanthropist. Straight was educated at Lincoln School in New York City and, after his mother's remarriage to Leonard Knight Elmhirst (1893–1974), in England at his family's Dartington Hall, followed by studies at the London School of Economics. His siblings were racing driver Whitney Straight and Academy Award–winning actress Beatrice Straight.

Straight's maternal grandparents were Flora Payne and William Collins Whitney (1841–1904), the United States Secretary of the Navy during the first Cleveland administration. Flora was the daughter of Senator Henry B. Payne of Ohio and sister of Colonel Oliver Hazard Payne.

== Career ==
While a student at Trinity College, Cambridge, in the mid-1930s, Straight became a Communist Party member and a part of an intellectual secret society known as the Cambridge Apostles. Straight worked for the Soviet Union as part of a spy ring whose members included Donald Maclean, Guy Burgess, Kim Philby and KGB recruiter Anthony Blunt. A document from Soviet archives of a report that Blunt made in 1943 to the KGB states, "As you already know the actual recruits whom I took were Michael Straight".

Straight finished third in the 1934 South African Grand Prix, a race dominated by his brother Whitney.

After returning to the United States in 1937, Straight worked as a speechwriter for President Franklin D. Roosevelt and was on the payroll of the Department of the Interior. Beginning in 1938, Straight carried on a covert relationship with Iskhak Akhmerov, the KGB spy. In 1940, Straight went to work in the Eastern Division of the United States Department of State.

In 1942, Straight joined the United States Army Air Forces, where he served as the pilot of a Boeing B-17 Flying Fortress, although he never saw combat. After the war, he took over as publisher of The New Republic, which was owned by his family. During his tenure, Straight hired former US vice president and future presidential candidate Henry A. Wallace to serve as the magazine's editor. Straight's writing for the magazine included a glowing review of J. R. R. Tolkien's The Lord of the Rings when it was published. In 1956, Straight left the magazine and began writing novels.

However, in 1963, in response to an offer of government employment in Washington, D.C., Straight faced a background check, and decided voluntarily to inform family friend and presidential special assistant Arthur M. Schlesinger, Jr. about his communist connections at Cambridge. This led directly to the exposure of Blunt as the recruiter of the Cambridge Five spy ring.

Straight served as the deputy chairman of the National Endowment for the Arts from 1969 to 1977. In 1988, he published Nancy Hanks: An Intimate Portrait, which told the story of the second chairman of the National Endowment for the Arts, with whom he had worked.

=== Memoirs and novels ===
Straight wrote several novels, including Carrington (1960), about the Fetterman massacre of 1866, and A Very Small Remnant (1963), about the Sand Creek massacre of 1864, both Westerns that received respectful reviews, as well as Happy and Hopeless (1979), a love story set in the Kennedy Administration that he published himself. In 1983, Straight detailed his Communist activities in a memoir entitled After Long Silence. His second memoir, On Green Spring Farm: The Life and Times of One Family in Fairfax County, Va., 1942 to 1966 was published posthumously by Devon Press.

== Personal life ==
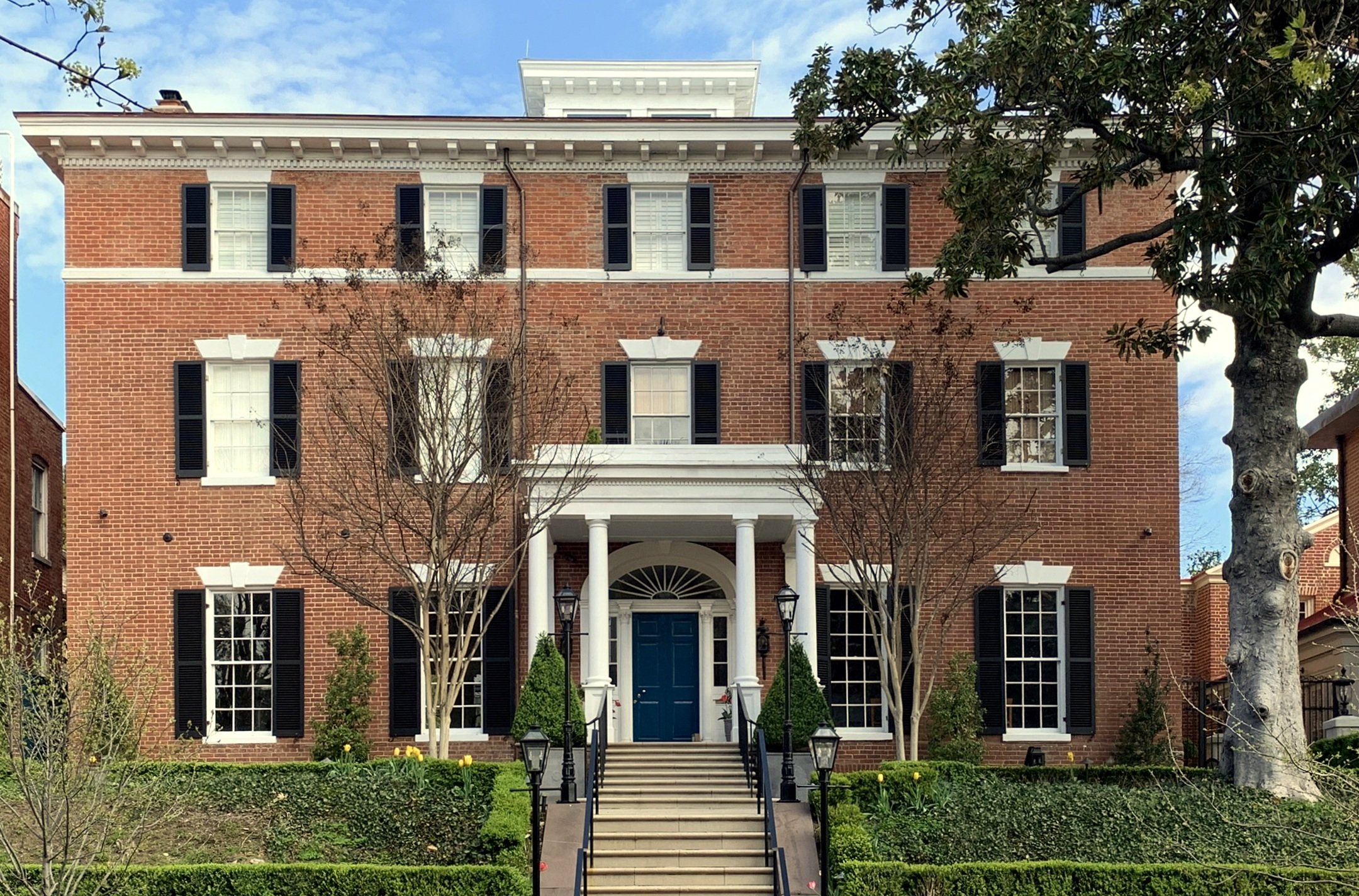
The Newton D. Baker House, Straight's Georgetown home until 1976

In September 1939, he married Belinda Crompton (1920–2015) of Wilton, New Hampshire, who was a child psychiatrist. Together with Belinda, until their divorce in 1969, he had five children:

- David Straight, who became a computer science professor at the University of Tennessee
- Michael Straight Jr.
- Susan Straight
- Diana Straight (Krosnick)
- Dorothy Straight (b. 1958), who was the youngest published author.

In 1965, Straight purchased the former Georgetown home of Jackie Kennedy, located at 3017 N Street, for $200,000 (equivalent to $2,076,000 in 2025). Kennedy bought the home when she moved out of the White House and Straight purchased it when Kennedy moved to New York City.

In 1974, Straight married his second wife, Nina G. Auchincloss Steers, the daughter of Nina Gore and Hugh D. Auchincloss. Steers was the half-sister of writer Gore Vidal and, coincidentally, a stepsister of Jacqueline Kennedy Onassis. Nina had previously been married to Newton Steers from 1957–1974 and with him she had three children: Hugh Auchincloss Steers (1963–1995), Ivan Steers, and Burr Steers (born 1965). The wedding was attended by Hugh D. Auchincloss, Janet Auchincloss, Jackie Kennedy, Renata Adler, Beatrice Straight and Peter Cookson. Straight lived in the Georgetown home from 1964 until 1976 when he sold it to Yolande Betbeze Fox, the former Miss America 1951. Straight and his wife spent $125,000 (equivalent to $816,000 in 2025) renovating the home and decided to move to Bethesda, Maryland in 1976 when he was vice chairman of the National Endowment for the Arts.

They subsequently divorced and in 1998, he married Katharine Gould, a child psychiatrist and art historian. Straight died of pancreatic cancer at his home in Chicago, Illinois, on January 4, 2004, aged 87. He also had a home on Martha's Vineyard in Massachusetts.

== In popular culture ==
In season 3 of the popular television show, The Crown, actor Paul Hilton plays Straight in the first episode.
