= Eugene Luther Vidal =

American commercial aviation pioneer (1895–1969)

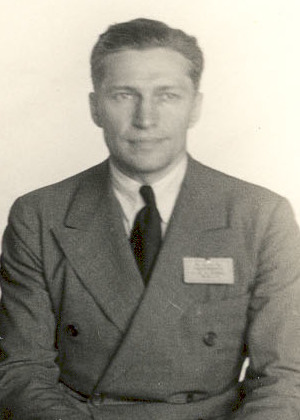
- Vidal in 1934
- Born: April 13, 1895; Madison, South Dakota, U.S.
- Died: February 20, 1969 (aged 73); Los Angeles, California, U.S.
- Spouses: Nina S. Gore (m. 1922; div. 1935); Katharine Roberts (m. 1939)
- Children: 3, including Gore Vidal

Eugene Luther Vidal (/vɪˈdɑːl/; April 13, 1895 – February 20, 1969) was an American commercial aviation pioneer, New Deal official, inventor, and athlete. For eight years, from 1929 to 1937, he worked closely with Amelia Earhart in a number of aviation-related enterprises, and was President Franklin Roosevelt's top civil aviation director from 1933 to 1937.

In his obituary, Time noted: "Eugene Vidal, 73, pioneer promoter of civil aviation and father of author Gore Vidal; in Los Angeles, California. Vidal starred in football at West Point and competed in the decathlon in the Antwerp Olympic Games of 1920. He later taught aviation and coached football at the academy, resigning his commission in 1926 to become assistant general manager of Transcontinental Air Transport (later TWA)."

From September 1933 to March 1937 he was Director of the Bureau of Air Commerce (a predecessor of the Federal Aviation Administration) in Washington, where he organized and expanded the government's civil aeronautics program, including creation of the first air traffic control system. Later he served as a director and part owner of Northeast Airlines, and as aviation adviser to the Army Chief of Staff."

Vidal became one of the pioneers in the commercial aviation industry and was an executive for three airlines during the 1920s and 1930s which developed into TWA, Eastern Airlines, and Northeast Airlines. He was the father of author Gore Vidal.

== Early life ==
Vidal was born in 1895 in Madison, South Dakota, the son of Margaret Ann (née Rewalt) and Felix Luther Vidal. He was the second eldest of five children. (Note: The Vidal children were: Lurene Vidal (born 1893), Gene Vidal, Amy Vidal (born 1903), Margaret Vidal (born 1910), and Felix L. Vidal, Jr. (born 1912). Felix graduated from West Point in 1933 and became a career officer in the United States Air Force, rising to the rank of brigadier general.) His paternal grandfather, Eugen Fidel Vidal, was born in Feldkirch, Austria, of Romansh descent, and his paternal grandmother, Emma Hartmann, was Swiss.

Vidal was a versatile athlete in both high school and college. At the University of South Dakota from 1913 to 1916, he was a letterman in football, basketball, baseball, and track. Vidal was captain of the university's 1915 football and 1916 basketball teams, leading the basketball team in scoring in both years, thereby assisting the university in winning an Intercollegiate Conference Title during his participation. Vidal received an engineering degree from USD and subsequently accepted an appointment from Congressman Royal C. Johnson to the United States Military Academy in July 1916.

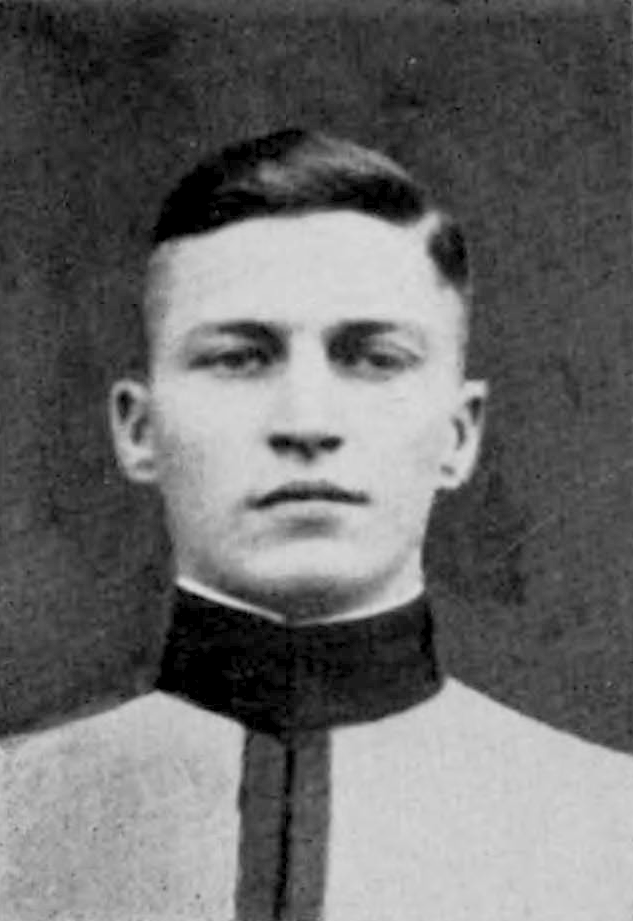
At West Point in 1918

As a football player for Army, he was described as a "ball carrier, punter, drop kicker, pass receiver and backup defenseman." In 1916 Vidal scored three touchdowns and drop-kicked a 45-yard field goal in a 30–10 victory over Notre Dame. He also scored the deciding touchdown in a 15–7 win against Navy on a forward pass thrown by Army quarterback Charlie Gerhardt. Army went 9–0 that season and outscored its opponents 235–36. The New York Times reported that he sat out the 1917 season because of a "hazing episode" but was afterward named captain of the 1918 team. He also starred in track and field and was Army's leading scorer on its 1917–18 basketball team at 8.3 points a game, for which he was named an All-American by the Helms Foundation.

At the age of 25, he was listed as 5 feet 10 inches (178 cm) in height and weighing 181 pounds (82 kg) by the U.S. Olympic Committee.

== Military service, Olympics and football ==
Vidal's West Point class (originally Class of 1920) graduated on November 1, 1918, 19 months early because of World War I, with Vidal ranked 72nd in general merit. He was commissioned a 2nd lieutenant in the Corps of Engineers but the war ended on November 11, 1918, before he could be sent overseas. Vidal was assigned to Camp A. A. Humphreys in Virginia between December 2, 1918, and June 4, 1919, as a student officer to complete his branch officer training at the U.S. Army Engineer School.

Vidal's national renown and prowess as an athlete resulted in many instances during his military career, with the war ended, where he was granted leaves or assignments outside his normal duties to perform in sports from intramurals to the Olympic Games and professional football. During the summer of 1919 he was a member of the United States team at the Inter-Allied Games at Paris, touring World War I battlefields afterwards. He returned to Camp Humphreys in September to enter its Company Officers Course and was promoted to first lieutenant on September 28, 1919. In May 1920 he was assigned to the 13th Engineer Regiment (Note: The 13th Engineers were the school unit for the Engineer School. When not detailed to athletics, Vidal spent his entire service in the Corps of Engineers at the school.) but took another leave of absence over the summer to attend the Olympic tryouts at Travers Island, New York, and the Summer Games in Antwerp, touring Europe afterwards with the U.S. Olympic Rugby Team until November. On his return to Camp Humphreys he undertook the advanced technical course in civil engineering.

On July 2, 1921, Vidal was detailed to Carlstrom Field, Florida, for pilot training at the Air Service Pilot School, and transferred in grade to the Air Service on July 28. The course of instruction lasted four months and Vidal received his Airplane Pilot rating. On January 16, 1922, he was assigned for advanced flight training at the Air Service Observation School at Henry Post Field, Oklahoma, remaining until June 15, 1922. (Note: From 1920 to 1924, because of a lack of appropriations, the Air Service offered only primary flying training to pilot trainees, conducted at either Carlstrom or March Field, California. All advanced pilot training was provided only in one of the four combat specialties (Pursuit, Bombardment, Attack, or Observation), and only Observation then had a specialized school for it. (A formal school for phased advanced pilot training was finally instituted in 1924 at Kelly Field.) The Air Service had only two pilot ratings in 1921–1922, Airplane Pilot and Junior Airplane Pilot, with the latter normally awarded only to enlisted pilots who did not undertake advanced training and be commissioned. (Cameron, pp. 223–226))

Vidal returned to West Point on July 5, 1922, for a four-year tour of duty as an assistant instructor in the Department of Tactics, the first member of the Air Service to be assigned to the academy staff. Later he was also an assistant instructor in Military Gymnastics and Physical Culture, with collateral duties coaching the academy's gymnastics (1922–1923) and track and field (1923–1924) squads. In 1925 Army head football coach John "Cap" McEwan named him an assistant football coach. (Note: Vidal and McEwan played together on the 1916 Army team, McEwan as a defensive standout.) At the end of the 1925 season he took a leave of absence from the academy on December 12.

Vidal resigned his commission on March 10, 1926, to go into Florida real estate, but he lost all his investments in the subsequent "bust." After coaching college football from 1926 to 1928, in March 1929 Vidal joined Transcontinental Air Transport (T.A.T.), where he rapidly rose to assistant general manager in its St. Louis, Missouri, office.

=== Olympics ===
Vidal participated as an athlete in the 1920 Olympic Games and as a coach in the 1924 Games. In 1920 he had one first-place finish in competing in the decathlon, in heat eight of the 100 meter dash, and placed seventh overall in the event. In 1924 in Paris, Vidal was an assistant track coach in charge of the modern pentathlon and decathlon squads. He was the first graduate of USD to be on an Olympic team.

=== Post-college football ===
While stationed at Carlstrom, Vidal also played briefly for the American Professional Football Association's Washington Senators in 1921, appearing in one game. (Note: Vidal stated that he also played briefly for the New York Giants of the National Football League, apparently during its inaugural season while he was stationed at the academy. (Association of Graduates memorial page)) When Cap McEwan left Army to become head football coach at Oregon, he hired Vidal as an assistant coach for the 1926, 1927, and 1928 seasons.

== Commercial aviation professional ==
Eugene Vidal, standing, third from left, with Amelia Earhart, sitting, left

In the Wall Street Crash of 1929, T.A.T. suffered significant financial losses. Before the year ended the entire executive staff in St. Louis, including Vidal, were fired. The following February he and veteran airmail pilot Paul Collins, who had also been let go by T.A.T., went to Philadelphia to organize the first commuter airline, the New York, Philadelphia and Washington Airway Corporation, better known as the Ludington Line, financed and owned by brothers Nicholas and Charles Townsend Ludington. Vidal became a company vice president and general manager. Amelia Earhart made an investment of $30,000 and was also made a vice president, in charge of publicity. In its first year, using seven 10-passenger Stinson SM-6000B tri-motors on an hourly daytime schedule between Washington, D.C., and New York, Ludington became the first purely passenger air carrier to show a profit. However, Vidal, Collins and Earhart all left the airline in 1932 when its profitability declined because of a failure in 1931 to obtain an airmail contract and its subsidies. (Note: This failure, in which the contract was awarded to Ludington's arch-rival Eastern Air Transport for a rate triple its own bid, subsequently led to the Air Mail scandal of 1934.) In August 1933, all three invested $2,500 each in the Boston and Maine Corporation's passenger airline subsidiary, Boston & Maine Airways, and incorporated a holding company, National Airways, Inc., to procure aircraft for the endeavor. Collins and Earhart were president and vice president respectively in the B&MA while Vidal, by then in government service, was an unpaid director. He became a partner in Boston & Maine Airways in 1938, which merged with National Airways in November, 1940 and became Northeast Airlines.

=== Department of Commerce ===
Vidal joined the United States Department of Commerce in June 1933, appointed by President Franklin D. Roosevelt as assistant director for Air Regulation in its Aeronautics Branch. Over 40 candidates were being sponsored for the directorship by various political supporters of the president, including Vidal, but Roosevelt delayed making the appointment. On September 19, 1933, with Earhart's recommendation to Eleanor Roosevelt, Vidal was named Director of Aeronautics. Soon after his appointment he appeared on the December 18, 1933, cover of Time magazine and was recognized by the United States Chamber of Commerce as one of the "12 Outstanding Young Men of America." On July 1, 1934, with Vidal continuing as its director, the Aeronautics Branch was renamed the Bureau of Air Commerce (BAC) to emphasize its status as a regulatory agency.

Vidal's term as director was a rocky one. In November 1933 he made public a proposal to develop a safe mass-produced light aircraft, the aviation equivalent of the Ford Model T automobile, that would cost only $700, calling it the "Poor Man's Airplane" project and part of a "New Deal for Aviation." The "$700 airplane" became an object of ridicule that would haunt the remainder of his time in government. (Note: While Vidal's admirers in general attribute the opposition to conservative opponents of the New Deal or those with vested interests in expensive commercial aircraft, most who opposed it did so on economic grounds, particularly the costs for engines and owner maintenance. Established manufacturers, who were being called upon to develop the product, saw it as a direct attack on themselves and the industry with the "unmistakable implication" that they were not making an honest effort to produce a safe aircraft at the lowest possible price, which they feared would undermine public confidence in aviation itself. (Innovation and the Development of Flight, p. 183)) Vidal called for $1,000,000 to be Federally funded to underwrite the project, and half of that was immediately allocated by the Public Works Administration, but by March 1934 opposition had solidified and the funds were cancelled, leaving Vidal no option except to find private sector sources willing to experiment on their own. (Note: National Air and Space Museum curator Tom D. Crouch put possibly the final word on "the People's Car" in 1999: "At a fundamental level, Eugene Vidal was wrong. ... Flying is not like driving an automobile. It is an unforgiving pursuit that demands a high degree of concentration and specialized skill." (Innovation and the Development of Flight, p. 184))

Vidal also organized Bureau headquarters so that decision-making authority was divided among himself and two assistant directors, for Air Navigation and for Air Regulation, in an attempt to make the Bureau more effective in its regulatory role. Of the BAC's seven functional divisions, however, only Administration and Aeronautic Information were responsible to Vidal and disorganization resulted from a lack of clear lines of authority. A dearth of procedures and policy created what one aviation historian described as a "paper jungle" of rules, bulletins, notices, and reports. (Note: Earhart's biographer Butler alleges he was undermined by his two assistants, both of whom she states coveted the director's job. Although they remained with the BAC when Vidal left, neither subsequently got the job when the Bureau was reorganized in April, 1937. FDR's Secretary of Commerce Daniel C. Roper ordered the shakeup of the BAC, citing "divided responsibility," "inefficient administration," and a "mess" in the Bureau. The two assistant positions were immediately reduced to one and their occupants sent on "study missions" to Latin America and Europe.)

After TWA Flight 6, a Douglas DC-2 carrying 13 persons, crashed at Atlanta, Missouri, on May 6, 1935, killing five including United States Senator Bronson M. Cutting, Vidal and the BAC came under severe criticism. The airliner had become lost in fog, missed its approach at the airport in Kansas City and was unable to find the secondary airport at Kirksville because the radio beacon there was not operating properly. Flight 6 ran low on fuel and either inadvertently flew into the ground or crashed trying to make an emergency landing in the dark. It was the seventh in a series of fatal crashes that took 43 lives. A lengthy investigation into the Flight 6 crash and airline safety in general (and by inference, the BAC) ensued throughout 1936 by a special subcommittee of the Senate Commerce Committee, chaired by Senator Royal S. Copeland. The Copeland Committee issued a "scathing" preliminary report in June 1936, indicting the BAC for a lack of airline safety, and while the report was biased against Vidal because he was a New Dealer (FDR had supported Copeland's opponent in the Democratic primary of 1934), the criticism damaged Roosevelt's re-election campaign. (Note: Vidal was open to personal criticism when an investigator testified that "a niggling economy" may have played a role in the crash because Vidal had ordered all secondary airports to reduce beacon wattage to save electricity costs. The beacon should have been detectable up to 25 miles from the airport but evidence showed that its effective range at the time of the crash was only two. The pilot had also been flying more than eight hours on a special waiver of the DOC regulation that Vidal granted TWA. Vidal made perceptions of his own culpability more likely three weeks after the crash, when he cancelled all such waivers after public criticism of them by the Air Line Pilots Association resulted in denunciations from members of Congress. (Hopkins, pp. 85 and 87))

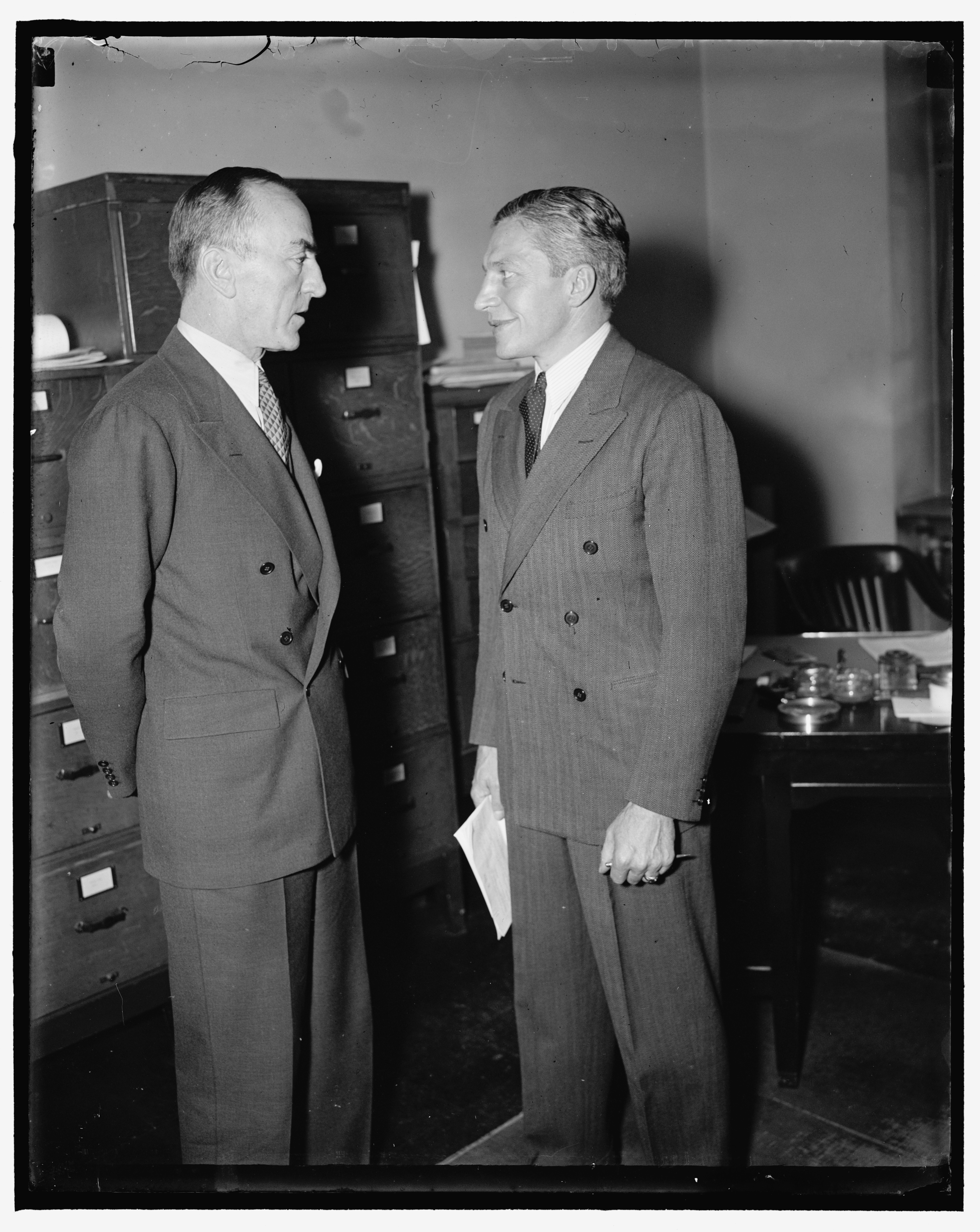
Vidal (right) meeting with Eddie Rickenbacker in 1937

In the face of criticism of his aviation policy by Congress and the airline industry, Roosevelt moved to reorganize the BAC, dismiss Vidal and his two assistant directors, and appoint a lawyer to replace him. He was compelled to reinstate Vidal, however, when Earhart advised Mrs. Roosevelt that she would publicly withdraw her support for FDR's re-election if he did not. After Copeland announced a new round of investigations in November, disorganization in the Bureau and continuing hostility from the aviation industry contributed to his resignation on February 28, 1937. (Note: Vidal was replaced on March 1, the day after his resignation, by attorney Fred D. Fagg, Jr., an authority on aviation law and a professor at Northwestern University. Fagg may have been the lawyer FDR had in mind for the job in September 1936, as he was then a technical adviser to the Copeland Committee. Fagg had also been an Air Service pilot in Europe during World War I and was appointed to the BAC as a troubleshooter. He completely reorganized the Bureau, setting it in proper working order, and restored confidence in both the BAC and its programs before resuming his interrupted academic career. Of note, he created a safety and planning section in the BAC for the study of improved safety devices for pilots. Rudolph W. "Shorty" Schroeder, head of the airline inspection service and a noted former test pilot for the Air Service, was promoted to the only assistant director's position, directly accountable to Fagg.)

After the 1936 elections, Earhart began final planning for her proposed equatorial circumnavigation of the world, with fuel and routing across the Pacific Ocean major considerations. Vidal suggested that landing strips be built on tiny, uninhabitable Howland Island as the largest point of land along the planned route within range of both New Guinea and Hawaii. Earhart agreed with the suggestion and made the request for its use. At the president's direction, the Department of the Interior, which administered the island, began constructing the strips in January 1937, using Works Progress Administration funds, an engineer from the BAC to supervise, a U.S. Army construction crew and a USCG cutter to transport them. Her first attempt to cross the Pacific ended in damage to her aircraft when it ground-looped in Hawaii on March 20, 1937, and, with Vidal by then gone from the BAC, she encountered obstacles from the new management of the Bureau attempting to prevent a second attempt. Earhart herself wrote that permission for the trip was granted by the BAC despite its reluctance because it was in no position to refuse after Vidal previously granted it.

Between November 1935 and July 1936, Vidal directed the establishment of the first air traffic control centers in the United States, initially negotiating an interline air traffic agreement with the airlines to build and operate several until funding could be appropriated for a Federal takeover of the system, which was obtained in March, 1936 for the next fiscal year. The BAC took over air control duties at the first three centers in Cleveland, Newark and Chicago on July 6, 1936, and hired the first 15 Federal air traffic controllers.

As head of the BAC, Vidal occupied the Chair 10 position on the 15-member Main Committee of the National Advisory Committee for Aeronautics (the NACA) from November 1933 to April 1937, and was one of only 120 persons to serve on the committee during its existence between 1915 and 1958, when it became NASA. Among the non-military members of the Main Committee during Vidal's term were Joseph S. Ames, Charles G. Abbot, Lyman J. Briggs, Harry F. Guggenheim, Charles A. Lindbergh, William P. MacCracken, Jr., and Orville Wright.

His expertise in aviation led him to a number of consulting positions in industry and the government. After leaving the BAC, Vidal was a technical consultant for Bendix Aviation through 1938, establishing his own laboratory in Bendix Borough (Teterboro), New Jersey. This was the foundation for what he described as "a development-licensing-patenting firm", the Vidal Research Corporation, "which for the next fifteen or so years acquired a number of licenses companies." In 1938, he incorporated the Aircraft Research Corporation to establish a brand name for aircraft sales. In the same year, he became an aviation consultant for the United States Plywood Corporation.

== Post-New Deal entrepreneur ==
In 1935, while pushing his concept of the $700 airplane, Vidal had seen the Atwood Duply Airmobile (civil registration number NC-15318), an experimental aircraft invented by Harry Atwood and test flown by Clarence Chamberlin. It was constructed with a seamless one-piece fuselage using "Duply," a steam-cooked laminate made from birch veneer strips impregnated with cellulose acetate. (Note: "Duply" was a portmanteau derived from "DuPont," whose labs were the site of the first experimentation, and "plywood." Atwood still owned Atwood Carolina, a pre-war airplane manufacturing company. His biographer states that he and Vidal were vying to be known as the "Henry Ford of aviation" and Atwood felt he was "cheated" out of his patent by Vidal, whom he says purchased it for $10,000 in 1939 and then only paid a year's royalty before filing for a patent under his own name with slight changes in the process. Atwood's process and Vidal's superficially resembled each other but employed different bonding methods. (Mansfield, pp, 132, 165, and 185–186)) After leaving the BAC, Vidal experimented from 1937 to 1940 with wood-resin composites using a thermosetting polymer process similar to Duramold under the banner of the Vidal Research Corporation. The experiments with the durable waterproof plywood material, said to have a greater tensile strength than a comparable thickness of aluminum, evolved initially into a small business producing only trays and dinghies. Vidal patented the process as "Vidal Weldwood", variously described as "cooked wood" or "molded plywood."

Howell W. Miller, a designer of light aircraft doing business as the Summit Aeronautical Company of Westfield, Massachusetts, (Note: "Pete" Miller assisted the Granville Brothers on the design of their Gee Bee racing aircraft. Starting with the New England Aircraft Corporation and the HM-1, he started a series of short-lived companies to market his original designs, one of which was Summit. (Smithsonian National Air and Space Museum Archives Division – SIRIS)) worked with Vidal in Bendix Borough to build a small airplane entirely from Weldwood: the Summit HM-5. A prototype was built (NX25332) and successfully flown. (Note: The HM-5 ("HM" for Hawks-Miller) was a two-person, low-wing, cantilever monoplane with retractable landing gear and side-by-side cabin seating, powered by a 75 hp (56 kW) Continental A75 4-cylinder air-cooled engine. It resembled both the Culver Cadet and Globe Swift all-metal sport planes but was developed independently. The wings were made in three lateral sections and the fuselage in two halves, from Weldwood, using spruce and mahogany veneers. The HM-5 had a wingspan of 28 feet (8.5 m), a height of 7.33 feet (2.23 m), and an overall length of just 22 feet (6.7 m), roughly the size of an automobile, with a top speed of 138 mph (222 km/h), a very low landing speed with flaps of 38 mph (61 km/h), and without flaps of 42 mph (68 km/h). If Vidal felt justified that he had at last produced his "People's Airplane," he was disappointed that another was never built. The design was used for an additional prototype, a sport aerobatic trainer marketed by Summit as the "Westfield Trainer," but only one was flown before World War II shut down Summit's production. (Jane's All the World's Aircraft, 1941 edition)) In 1940, based on the successful fabrication of the HM-5, Vidal began a project under the Aircraft Research trade name to manufacture a basic trainer for the Air Corps, designated the XBT-11, (Note: The BT-11 was to be an all-Weldwood airplane similar in size and weight to the Vultee BT-13 and powered by the same Pratt & Whitney R-985-25 (450 hp [ 340 kW ] / ) engine.) But, Vidal was unable to procure a contract from the Materiel Division of the Air Corps after fabricating a mockup.

After the United States was drawn into World War II, Vidal obtained contracts to manufacture war materiel, primarily deck houses for PT boats, (Note: The variant of the Vidal process used for watercraft was known as Weldwood Marine.) pontoons and aircraft drop tanks then earned him the wealth that had eluded his earlier entrepreneurial attempts. Restrictions on the use of metals in 1942, particularly aluminum, caused by an increased demand by shipbuilders and aircraft manufacturers, led both the Army and the Navy to demand designs for components and training equipment that could be manufactured from wood composites. Investments in factories to build Weldwood products under license boomed immediately. One such licensee was the Hughes Aircraft Division of Hughes Tool Company, and another was U. S. Plywood. The success of the product was well-publicized and earned him an honorary doctorate from Lawrence College.

Vidal wanted to re-enter military service in the Army Air Forces during the war but, in July 1942, suffered a massive heart attack, spending eight months as a convalescent, which prevented him from serving again. He retired from active participation in his company in the early 1950s, but remained a part-owner and director of Northeast Airlines. He continued to make furniture and other products out of Weldwood in his home workshop.

Vidal acted as aviation adviser to the Army Chief of Staff from 1955 to 1965, served on the Scientific Advisory Panel of the Secretary of the Army and was a member of the Howze Board in 1962, which developed the air assault concept for the Army. In 1967, he visited the most famous offshoot of the concept, the 1st Cavalry Division (Airmobile), at its base camp in South Vietnam.

== Personal life ==
On January 11, 1922, Vidal married Nina Gore, daughter of Democrat Thomas Gore, one of the first two senators from Oklahoma. Their only child was born on October 3, 1925:

- Gore Vidal (born Eugene Louis Vidal) (1925–2012)

They divorced in 1935 and Nina subsequently married stockbroker Hugh D. Auchincloss. In December 1939, after a brief courtship, Vidal married Katharine "Kit" Roberts, then a 20-year-old Powers Agency model. They had two children:

- Gene Vance Vidal (born 1942)
- Valerie Vidal Hewitt (born 1945)

It is alleged in Susan Butler's biography East to the Dawn: The Life of Amelia Earhart, and the possibility endorsed by Kathleen Winters in Amelia Earhart: The Turbulent Life of an American Icon, that Vidal had a long-standing romantic relationship with Earhart, from 1929 when they worked together for Transcontinental Air Transport to her disappearance in 1937. His son, Gore Vidal's, cover testimonial to Butler's biography adds credence to the story. (Note: On the other hand, another of Earhart's many biographers, Doris Rich, takes the same set of circumstances and concludes the opposite is true: that Vidal was "a family man, not a lover." (Rich, p.237))

Vidal died of complications from kidney cancer in 1969 in Los Angeles, California, at the age of 73, while on a trip around the world. His ashes were scattered at Fort Belvoir, which had been Camp A.A. Humphreys and his first posting after graduation from West Point.

== Legacy ==
- Vidal is in the South Dakota Sports Hall of Fame.
- Vidal was portrayed by actor Ewan McGregor in the 2009 film Amelia.
- Since 1971, each year the Gene L. Vidal Memorial Award is presented at the United States Military Academy to the Cadet who has the "Most Significant and Practical Suggestion Adopted for Future Benefit of the United States Military Academy."

== Notes ==
Footnotes

Citations
