= Kathleen Winters =

Canadian-American writer and aviator (1949-2010

- Born: December 2, 1949; Toronto, Canada
- Died: August 19, 2010 (aged 60)
- Citizenship: United States
- Education: Metropolitan State University
- Occupation: Biographer
- Writing career
- Notable work: Anne Morrow Lindbergh: First Lady of the Air

Kathleen Winters (December 2, 1949– August 19, 2010) was an American author and aviator. Winters was born in Toronto. Her family immigrated to Georgia when she was aged six. She later moved to Minnesota and graduated from Metropolitan State University.

== Life ==
By age 19 she had both commercial pilot and flight instructor licenses. The holder of several state records for her glider flights, she was married to Jim Hard, a soaring pilot who held numerous records and awards of his own.

== Written works ==
She wrote Anne Morrow Lindbergh: First Lady of the Air, a 2006 biography of Charles Lindbergh’s wife, emphasizing the subject's own distinguished aeronautical career. Winters was voted "Best Aviation Writing in 2008" by the Minnesota Aviation Hall of Fame. A second book, Amelia Earhart: The Turbulent Life of an American Icon, was in final preparation at the time of her sudden death from a cerebral hemorrhage.

== Bibliography ==
- Anne Morrow Lindbergh: First Lady of the Air. Macmillan, Palgrave. 2006. ISBN 978-0230616691.
- Amelia Earhart: The Turbulent Life of an American Icon. Macmillan, Palgrave. 2010. ISBN 978-1-403-96932-3.
