= Hugh Auchincloss Brown =

American engineer and pseudoscience purveyor (1879–1975)

Hugh Auchincloss Brown (23 December 1879 – 9 November 1975) was an electrical engineer who advanced a theory of catastrophic pole shift. Brown claimed that massive accumulation of ice at the poles caused recurring tipping of the axis in cycles of approximately 4000–7500 years. He argued that because the earth wobbles on the axis and the crust slides on the mantle, a shift was demonstrably imminent, and suggested the use of nuclear explosions to break up the ice to forestall catastrophe.

Brown graduated from Columbia University in 1900. He is a grandson of the Scottish American merchant Hugh Auchincloss (1780–1855), who founded a mercantile company which became known as J & H Auchincloss, or Auchincloss Brothers. Through his mother, Matilda Auchincloss (1824–1894), Brown was a cousin of businessman Hugh D. Auchincloss Sr. and first cousin once removed of stockbroker and Standard Oil heir Hugh D. Auchincloss Jr., stepfather of Jacqueline Kennedy Onassis and Lee Radziwill. Through his father, Horatio Silas Brown, he was descended from John Howland, a signatory of the Mayflower Compact, and Elizabeth Tilley, a fellow Mayflower passenger.

== Works ==
- Popular awakening concerning the impending flood (privately printed 1948)
- Cataclysms of the Earth (1967)
