= Hugh Auchincloss Steers =

American painter

- Born: June 12, 1962; Washington, D.C., U.S.
- Died: March 1, 1995 (aged 32); New York City, U.S.
- Education: Hotchkiss School
- Alma mater: Yale University (1985); Skowhegan School of Painting and Sculpture (1991)
- Occupation: Figurative painter
- Parent(s): Newton Steers; Nina Gore Auchincloss
- Relatives: Burr Steers (brother); Gore Vidal (uncle); Hugh D. Auchincloss (grandfather); Nina S. Gore (grandmother); Thomas Gore (great-grandfather)

Hugh Auchincloss Steers (June 12, 1962 – March 1, 1995) was an American painter who often depicted the intimate lives of members of the LGBTQ+ community and their struggles during the AIDS epidemic of the 1980s–1990s. He died of AIDS related complications at the age of 32.

== Early life ==
Steers was born on June 12, 1962, to Nina Gore Auchincloss and Newton Steers. He had one older brother, Ivan Steers, and a younger brother, Burr Steers, who would become a filmmaker. He attended the Hotchkiss School in Lakeville, Connecticut and graduated Cum Laude from Yale University, being trained in art, specifically painting, in 1985. He later attended Skowhegan School of Painting and Sculpture in Maine, graduating in 1991.

Steers was the grandson of Hugh D. Auchincloss and Nina Gore and the great-grandson of Thomas Gore. His mother was the half-sister of writer Gore Vidal and a stepsister of Jacqueline Kennedy Onassis. In 1974, his parents divorced and later that same year, his mother married her second husband, Michael Straight. The wedding was attended by Hugh D. Auchincloss, Janet Auchincloss, Jackie Kennedy, Renata Adler, Beatrice Straight, and Peter Cookson.

== Personal life ==
Despite often being viewed by outsiders as quiet, during his adulthood, Steers was involved in the New York City club scene. Spending time with his friends and fellow artists at clubs like Studio 54.

At the age of 25, Steers was diagnosed with HIV. He was involved with the ACT UP movement as well as several other organizations involved with LGBTQ+ rights.

Hugh died at the age of 32 in 1995, just one year after being diagnosed with brain cancer as a result of his HIV.

== Art ==
In 1989, Steers received a Pollock-Krasner Foundation Fellowship and had his first solo exhibition. He went on to exhibit his work in over 30 shows across the United States and Italy.

Steers' work, primarily figurative painting, is featured in the Whitney Museum of American Art, the Walker Art Center, and the Denver Art Museum. He painted in a style that mixed dreamlike allegory with Expressionist-tinged realism and incorporated art history references. Steers's work relied on heavy and deliberate brush strokes to call attention to his subjects' often frail forms. In the 1990s, his work increasingly dealt with AIDS and many of his paintings showed male figures alone nearly nude or clothed in women's attire. Steers also depicted pairs of men bathing, dressing each other, and embracing. In his final works, he painted a self-portrait of a man dressed in a white hospital gown with white high heels. The figure is shown entering the lives of other characters as both an avenging and a guardian angel.

Despite living through the AIDS crisis and being directly affected—being HIV positive himself as well as witnessing several friends pass as a result of the disease—Steers refused to paint from life, he only painted allegorically, telling the story of himself and his friends struggling through this period of time.

He was inspired by artists like Edward Hopper, Pierre Bonnard, Edgar Degas, El Greco, Francisco Goya, and Edvard Munch and their depictions of tragedy and intimacy within daily life.

A comprehensive monographic catalogue of Steers's work was published by Visual AIDS in 2015.

== Exhibitions ==
- Drawing Center, New York (1987)
- Albright-Knox Gallery, Buffalo, NY (1988)
- Denver Art Museum, Denver, Colorado (1991)
- Midtown Galleries, New York (1990)
- Richard Anderson, New York (1992)
- New Museum of Contemporary Art (1994)
- Cadmus, Steers, Warhol (2012)
- Art Basel Miami Beach (2012)
- Art Kabinett Art Basel Miami Beach History, Painting (2012)
- Hugh Steers, Alexander Gray Associates (2013)
- Hugh Steers, Whitney Museum of American Art (2013)
- Art AIDS America, Tacoma Art Museum (2015)
- Hugh Steers' Day Light Alexander Gray Associates (2015)
- Hugh Steers' Strange State of Being Alexander Gray Associates (2021)
