= Newton Steers =

American politician (1917–1993)

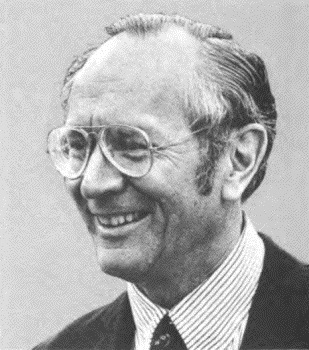

Member of the U.S. House of Representatives from Maryland's 8th district
- In office January 3, 1977 – January 3, 1979
- Preceded by: Gilbert Gude
- Succeeded by: Michael Barnes

Member of the Maryland Senate
- In office 1971–1977
- Preceded by: Thomas M. Anderson Jr.
- Succeeded by: Howard A. Denis

Personal details
- Born: Newton Ivan Steers Jr. January 13, 1917 Glen Ridge, New Jersey, U.S.
- Died: February 11, 1993 (aged 76) Bethesda, Maryland, U.S.
- Party: Republican
- Spouses: Nina Gore Auchincloss (m. 1957; div. 1974) Inge Gabriele Wirsich Irwin (m. 1978)
- Children: 3, including Hugh Auchincloss Steers and Burr Steers
- Education: Yale University (BA, JD); Massachusetts Institute of Technology
- Occupation: Attorney, Politician

Military service
- Allegiance: United States
- Branch/service: United States Army Air Corps
- Years of service: 1941–1946
- Battles/wars: World War II

Newton Ivan Steers Jr. (January 13, 1917 – February 11, 1993), was a U.S. Congressman who represented Maryland's 8th congressional district from January 3, 1977, to January 3, 1979.

== Early life ==
Newton Ivan Steers Jr. was born on January 13, 1917, in Glen Ridge, New Jersey, to Newton Ivan Steers and Claire L. Steers. His father was president of the DuPont Film Manufacturing Corporation for seventeen years. Steers was the youngest of five children born to his parents: Helen Steers, who married George Van Trump Burgess, Charlotte Steers, who married Paul Van Winkle, Mrs. W. Breckinridge De Riemer, and Margaret Steers, who married L. H. Brague Jr.

Steers attended the White Plains, New York, public schools. He graduated from the Hotchkiss School in Lakeville, Connecticut, in 1935, and received a B.A. from Yale University in 1939. He obtained a Certificate of Advanced Meteorology from the Massachusetts Institute of Technology in 1943, and his J.D. degree from the Yale Law School in 1948.

== Career ==
Steers was admitted to the New York bar (1958), and later to the District of Columbia bar (1967), and worked with the DuPont company from 1939 to 1941. During World War II, he served in United States Army Air Corps from 1941 to 1946. After the war, he worked with GAF Corp. from 1948 to 1951, and the United States Atomic Energy Commission from 1951 to 1953. He also became president of several investment companies in New York from 1953 through 1965. Steers was said to have made his fortune during the 1950s through investing in mutual funds, forming the Atomic Development Mutual Fund in 1953 with a group of friends. The fund specialized in "securities of companies participating in activities resulting from the natural sciences."

=== Political career ===
In 1962, Steers entered politics and was an unsuccessful candidate for election in 1962 to the 88th Congress. He served as Maryland Republican State chairman from 1964 to 1966. In 1967, Gov. Spiro T. Agnew appointed Steers the Maryland State insurance commissioner, a post he held until 1970. That year, Steers became Maryland Assistant Secretary of Licensing and Regulation and a member of the Maryland State Senate, serving from 1971 to 1977. He served as a delegate to the Republican National Convention in 1964 and 1984.

In 1976, Steers was elected as a Republican to the 95th Congress over Democrat Lanny Davis and independent Robin Ficker, serving from January 3, 1977, until January 3, 1979. He ran for reelection in 1978 to the 96th Congress and lost to Democrat Michael D. Barnes, and unsuccessfully challenged Barnes in 1980. He was also an unsuccessful candidate for election as Lieutenant Governor of Maryland in 1982, losing to Democrat J. Joseph Curran, Jr. Steers was a resident of Bethesda, Maryland, until his death there in 1993.

== Personal life ==
In 1957, Steers married Nina Gore Auchincloss (born 1937), the daughter of Hugh D. Auchincloss (1897-1976) and Nina S. Gore (1903–1978). Nina S. Gore had previously been married to Eugene Vidal, with whom she had one child, the writer Gore Vidal, Nina Gore Auchincloss's half-brother. Hugh D. Auchincloss later married Janet Lee Bouvier, the mother of Jacqueline Kennedy, who became a stepsister to Nina Gore Auchincloss. Kennedy was matron of honor at the wedding and then-Sen. John F. Kennedy was one of the groomsmen. Together, Steers and Nina Gore Auchincloss had three children:

- Hugh Auchincloss Steers (1962–1995), a painter who died of AIDS-related complications
- Ivan Steers
- Burr Gore Steers (born 1965), a writer and filmmaker

Steers and Auchincloss were divorced in 1974. In 1978, he married Inge Gabriele (née Wirsich) Irwin, to whom he remained married until his death. Inge had a son, Kristof Andreas Irwin, from a previous marriage who became Steers's stepson. Steers died on February 11, 1993, at his home in Bethesda, Maryland after a long battle with cancer.

== Electoral history ==
Maryland's 8th congressional district election, 1976
Party	Candidate	Votes	%
Republican	Newton Steers	111,274	46.82
Democratic	Lanny Davis	100,343	42.22
Independent	Robin Ficker	26,035	10.96
Total votes		237,652	100.00
Republican hold			

Maryland's 8th congressional district election, 1978
Party	Candidate	Votes	%
Democratic	Michael D. Barnes	81,851	51.27
Republican	Newton Steers (Incumbent)	77,807	48.73
Total votes		159,658	100.00
Democratic gain from Republican			

Maryland's 8th congressional district election, 1980
Party	Candidate	Votes	%
Democratic	Michael D. Barnes (Incumbent)	148,301	59.33
Republican	Newton Steers	101,659	40.67
Total votes		249,960	100.00
Democratic hold			

Maryland's 8th congressional district election, 1982
Party	Candidate	Votes	%
Democratic	Michael D. Barnes (Incumbent)	121,761	71.34
Republican	Elizabeth W. Spencer	48,910	28.66
Total votes		170,671	100.00
Democratic hold			

Maryland Senate
Preceded by Thomas M. Anderson Jr. Louise Gore	Member of the Maryland Senate from the 3A district 1971–1975; Served alongside: James S. McAuliffe, Jr.	Constituency abolished
Preceded by Mary L. Nock; Frederick Malkus	Member of the Maryland Senate from the 16th district 1975–1977	Succeeded by Howard A. Denis
U.S. House of Representatives
Preceded by Gilbert Gude	Member of the U.S. House of Representatives from Maryland's 8th congressional district 1977–1979	Succeeded by Michael D. Barnes
