= Hugh D. Auchincloss Jr. =

American stockbroker and lawyer

Hugh D. Auchincloss
- Born: Hugh Dudley Auchincloss Jr. August 29, 1897; Newport, Rhode Island, U.S.
- Died: November 20, 1976 (aged 79); Georgetown, Washington, D.C., U.S.
- Burial place: Common Burying Ground and Island Cemetery, Newport
- Education: Groton School; Yale University (1920); Columbia Law School (1924)
- Occupations: Stockbroker, lawyer
- Spouses: Maya de Chrapovitsky (m. 1925; div. 1932) Nina S. Gore (m. 1935; div. 1941) Janet Lee Bouvier (m. 1942)
- Children: 5, including Nina Straight and Janet Auchincloss Rutherfurd
- Relatives: James C. Auchincloss (cousin); Hugh Auchincloss Steers (grandson); Burr Steers (grandson)

Hugh Dudley Auchincloss Jr. (August 15, 1897 – November 20, 1976) was an American stockbroker and lawyer. He became the second husband of Nina S. Gore, mother of Gore Vidal, and also the second husband of Janet Lee Bouvier, the mother of First Lady Jacqueline Kennedy Onassis (wife of President John F. Kennedy) and Caroline Lee Bouvier.

== Early life ==
Auchincloss was born at Hammersmith Farm in Newport, Rhode Island, in 1897. He was the son of Hugh Dudley Auchincloss (1858–1913), a merchant and financier, and Emma Brewster Jennings. His maternal grandparents were Oliver Burr Jennings and Esther Judson Goodsell. His uncles included Edgar Stirling Auchincloss, the father of U.S. Representative James C. Auchincloss, and John Winthrop Auchincloss, the grandfather of Louis Auchincloss, an attorney and author. He had two older sisters, Esther Judson Auchincloss and Ann Burr Auchincloss.

Auchincloss graduated from Groton School in Massachusetts, then attended Yale University. After an interruption for service in the U.S. Navy during World War I, he was elected to the Elihu Senior Society and graduated in 1920. He also studied at Kings College at Cambridge, and earned a law degree from Columbia Law School in 1924.

== Career ==
From 1924 to 1926, Auchincloss practiced law in New York City, before joining the Commerce Department as a special agent in aeronautics. In 1927, he was appointed an aviation expert in the State Department. Four years later in 1931, he resigned government service to form a brokerage firm.

In 1931, he bought his seat on the New York Stock Exchange for $235,000 (equivalent to $4,975,000 in 2025). It was reported that he used some of the large inheritance received from his mother to found the Washington, DC brokerage firm of "Auchincloss, Parker & Redpath" with Chauncey G. Parker and Albert G. Redpath. The firm eventually had 16 offices with two in New York City and the rest spread along the East Coast. In 1970, the firm merged with Thomson & McKinnon, a brokerage house based in New York. At the time of the merger, the new firm, known as Thomson & McKinnon Auchincloss, had assets under management of $160 million (equivalent to $905,263,000 in 2025) and 58 offices. Auchincloss was highly regarded by his staff and colleagues; on his 78th birthday in 1975 he received a citation from associates in his firm's Washington office saying that they had “had their lives enriched by his high standards, a code of ethics and excellence.” By the time of Auchincloss's death a year later, the firm was known as Thomson & McKinnon Auchincloss Kohlmeyer.

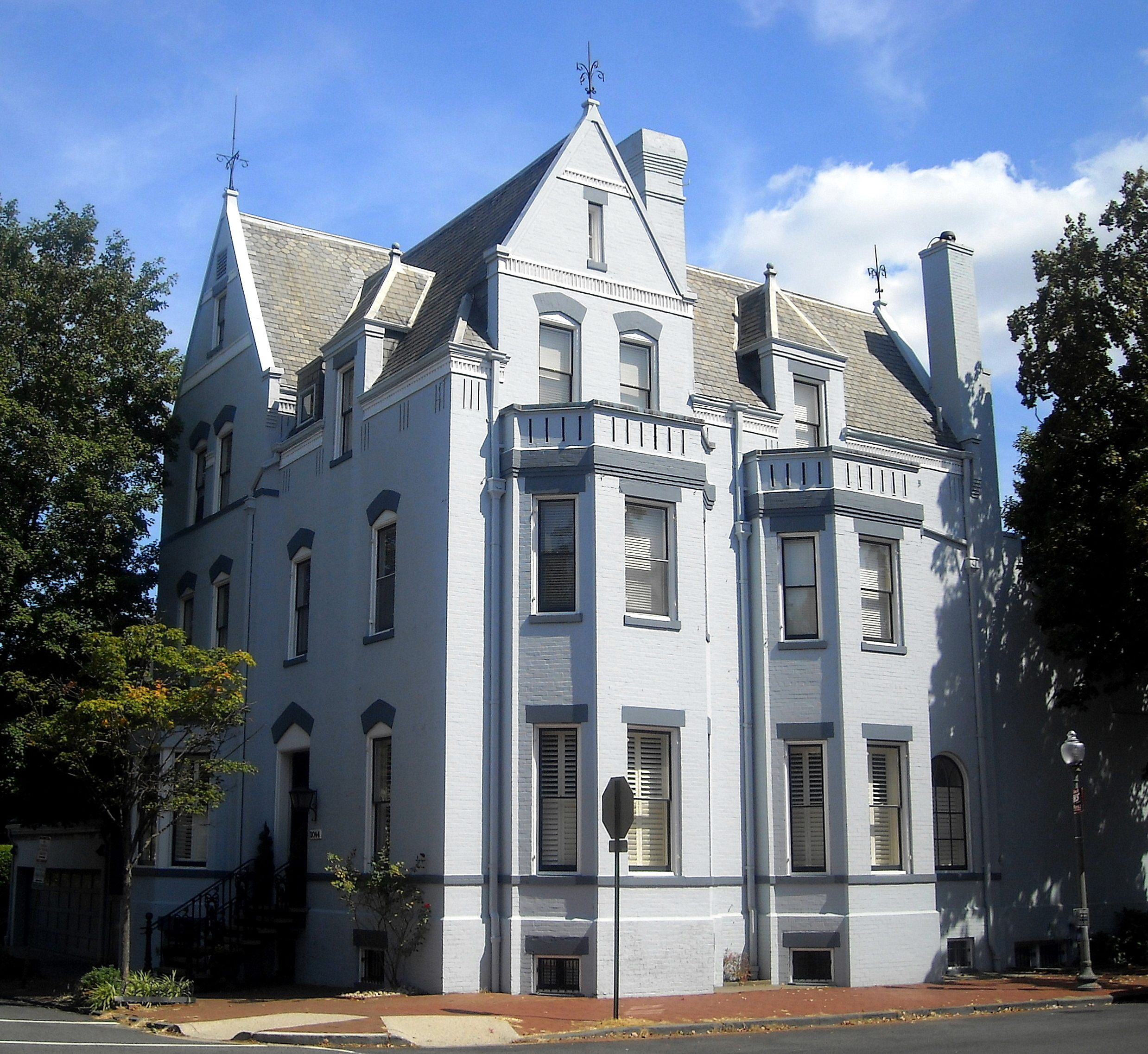
Auchincloss' former residence in Georgetown, Washington, D.C.

During World War II, Auchincloss worked for the Office of Naval Intelligence and the War Department and was commissioned with the rank of Lieutenant in the Naval Reserve on May 26, 1942, serving in the United States Navy.

== Personal life ==
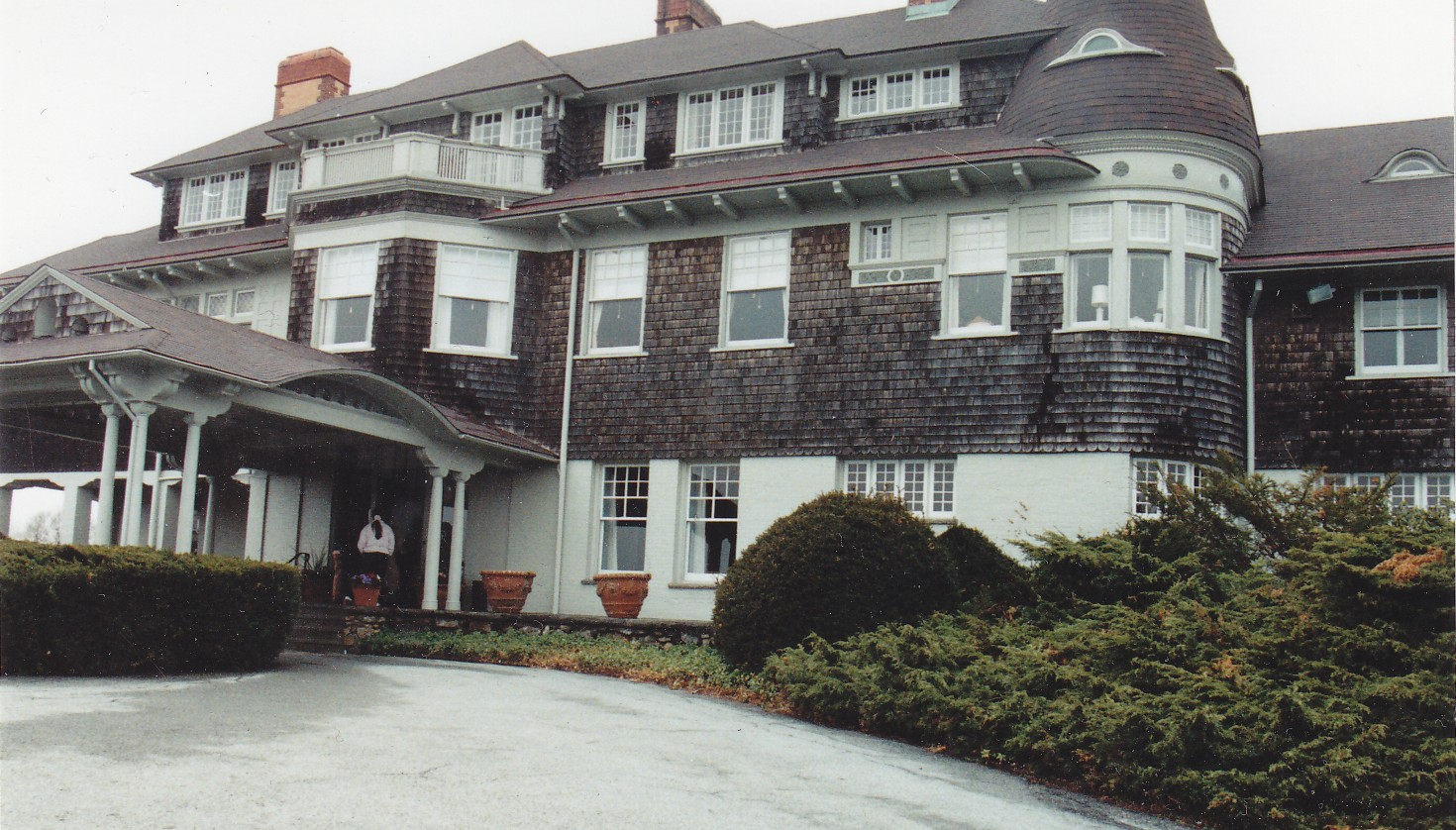
Main house of Hammersmith Farm

Auchincloss was married three times and had five children. His first marriage was on June 4, 1925, to Maya de Chrapovitsky (1899–1990), a Russian noblewoman. Before their divorce in 1932, they had one child together:

- Hugh Dudley "Yusha" Auchincloss III (1927–2015)

In 1935, he married Nina S. Vidal, the only daughter of Senator Thomas Gore. Nina had previously been married to Eugene Vidal, a Roosevelt appointee, and with him had Gore Vidal, the author. Before their divorce in 1941, they had two children:

- Nina Gore Auchincloss (born 1937)
- Thomas Gore Auchincloss (1939-2024)

On June 21, 1942, he married for the third and final time to Janet Lee Bouvier, mother of Jacqueline Kennedy Onassis and Lee Radziwill. They remained married until his death in 1976 and had two children together:

- Janet Jennings Auchincloss (1945–1985)
- James Lee Auchincloss (born 1947)

Auchincloss was responsible for getting Jacqueline Bouvier her first job in journalism at the Washington Times-Herald. He gave her away at her wedding to future president John F. Kennedy, the reception of which was held at Hammersmith Farm on September 12, 1953. A long-time financial contributor to the Republican Party, he contributed to the campaign of his Democratic stepson-in-law, saying "I want to live in harmony with Mrs. Auchincloss and all the other members of the family."

Auchincloss died at his home in Georgetown on November 20, 1976, and was later buried at Island Cemetery in Newport.

=== Club memberships ===
Auchincloss was a member of the University Club, the New York Yacht Club, Grolier Club and Racquet and Tennis Club of New York. In Washington, he was a member of the Burning Tree Club and the Metropolitan Club.
