= America's Prince: The John F. Kennedy Jr. Story =

2003 biographical film

- Based on: The Day John Died by Christopher Andersen
- Screenplay by: Jon Maas
- Directed by: Eric Laneuville
- Starring: Kristoffer Polaha; Portia de Rossi; Jacqueline Bisset
- Theme music composer: Mason Daring
- Country of origin: United States
- Original language: English

Production
- Producers: Greg Copeland; Tamra Pica
- Cinematography: David Herrington
- Editor: Mark Conte
- Running time: 100 min
- Production company: 20th Century Fox

Original release
- Network: TBS
- Release: January 12, 2003

America's Prince: The John F. Kennedy Jr. Story is a 2003 20th Century Fox television film. It is a biographical film about John F. Kennedy Jr. and based on Christopher Andersen's 2000 bestseller, The Day John Died. It was directed by Eric Laneuville from a screenplay by Jon Maas, and stars Kristoffer Polaha, Portia de Rossi and Jacqueline Bisset in principal roles. It premiered on TBS on January 12, 2003.

== Outline ==
The film outlines key moments of Kennedy's life, beginning with his fatal plane crash. Time is also devoted to his trying time at law school and his relationship with his iron-willed mother. The film also charts his romantic life, from his relationship with film actress Daryl Hannah to his marriage to Carolyn Bessette. It also charts his attempts to distance himself from the political Kennedy dynasty, instead devoting his efforts to a career as a magazine editor.

== Cast ==
- Kristoffer Polaha as John F. Kennedy Jr.
- Portia de Rossi as Carolyn Bessette-Kennedy
- Jacqueline Bisset as Jacqueline Bouvier Kennedy Onassis
- Tara Chocol as Daryl Hannah
- Robert N. Smith as Michael Berman
- Kirsten Bishop as Caroline Kennedy Schlossberg
- Jennifer Baxter as Lauren Bessette
- Tammy Isbell as Charley
- Colin Fox as Richard Lawton
- Michael Riley as Douglas Conte
- George R. Robertson as Maurice Tempelsman
- Katie Griffin as Shrine Girl 1

== See also ==
- Kennedy Curse
