= American Prince: JFK Jr. =

American documentary series

- Genre: Documentary
- Directed by: Rebecca Gitlitz
- Country of origin: United States
- Original language: English
- No. of episodes: 3

Production
- Executive producers: Jon Adler; Ian Orefice; Lance Nichols; Amanda Spain; Amy Entelis; Lyle Gamm; Katie Hinman
- Producer: Spencer Wilking
- Cinematography: Dominic Savio
- Editors: Mario Diaz; Curtis Grout; Monica Yuen; Marcos Meconi
- Running time: 43 minutes
- Production company: EverWonder Studio

Original release
- Network: CNN
- Release: August 9 – August 23, 2025

American Prince: JFK Jr. is a 2025 documentary miniseries directed by Rebecca Gitlitz. It follows the life of John F. Kennedy Jr. and the launch of George.

It premiered August 9, 2025, on CNN.

== Premise ==
Explores the life of John F. Kennedy Jr. and the launch of George. Carole Radziwill, Gary Ginsberg, Hamilton South, Steve Gillon, Cindy Crawford, Robert De Niro, Graydon Carter, Tina Brown, and Kurt Andersen are among those interviewed.

== Episodes ==
No.	Title	Directed by	Original release date	U.S. viewers (millions)
1	"The Boy Who Would Be King"	Rebecca Gitlitz	August 9, 2025	0.486
2	"Ladies & Gentleman, Meet George"	Rebecca Gitlitz	August 16, 2025	0.526
3	"The Final Summer"	Rebecca Gitlitz	August 23, 2025	0.496

== Production ==
In May 2025, it was announced CNN had ordered the series, with EverWonder Studio producing.

== Reception ==
Kevin Fallon of The Daily Beast praised the series writing: "Also a reminder that the Golden Boy of Camelot was a human—and a complicated one, at that." Conversely, John Anderson of The Wall Street Journal was more critical writing: "The fact that it interviews some of the same bottom-feeders who pursued the couple so relentlessly indicates cluelessness on the part of the filmmakers."

== See also ==
- Love Story – 2026 television series about John F. Kennedy Jr. and Carolyn Bessette
