= Love Story (2026 TV series) =

American television anthology series

- Genre: Biography; Romance; Drama; Anthology
- Created by: Connor Hines
- Inspired by: Once Upon a Time by Elizabeth Beller
- Starring: Sarah Pidgeon; Paul Anthony Kelly; Grace Gummer; Naomi Watts
- Music by: Bryce Dessner
- Country of origin: United States
- Original language: English
- No. of seasons: 1
- No. of episodes: 9

Production
- Executive producers: Ryan Murphy; Nina Jacobson; Brad Simpson; Connor Hines; Max Winkler; Eric Kovtun; Nissa Diederich; Scott Robertson; Monica Levinson; Kim Rosenstock; D.V. DeVincentis; Tanase Popa
- Cinematography: Jason McCormick; Pepe Avila del Pino; Andrei Schwartz
- Editors: Adam Penn; Hye Mee Na; Franzis Müller; Jordan Bracewell
- Running time: 43–58 minutes
- Production companies: Ryan Murphy Television; Color Force; 20th Television

Original release
- Network: FX; FX on Hulu
- Release: February 12, 2026 – present

Related
- American Story

Love Story is an American biographical romantic-drama anthology television series created by Connor Hines and executive produced by Ryan Murphy, Nina Jacobson, Brad Simpson, D.V. DeVincentis, Kim Rosenstock, and Hines. The fifth installment in the American Story media franchise, it aired on FX and FX on Hulu.

The first season, subtitled John F. Kennedy Jr. & Carolyn Bessette, stars Sarah Pidgeon and Paul Anthony Kelly as Carolyn Bessette-Kennedy and John F. Kennedy Jr. respectively, and chronicles their whirlwind courtship and marriage. The series premiered on February 12, 2026.

== Cast ==
=== Main ===
- Sarah Pidgeon as Carolyn Bessette, publicist at fashion house Calvin Klein
- Paul Anthony Kelly as John F. Kennedy Jr., son of late John F. Kennedy, 35th President of the United States
- Grace Gummer as Caroline Kennedy, John Jr.'s older sister
- Naomi Watts as Jacqueline Kennedy Onassis, former First Lady of the United States and John Jr.'s mother

=== Recurring ===
- Alessandro Nivola as Calvin Klein, Carolyn's boss
- Leila George as Kelly Klein, Calvin's wife and Carolyn's friend
- Sydney Lemmon as Lauren Bessette, Carolyn's older sister
- Ben Shenkman as Edwin Schlossberg, John's brother-in-law
- Erich Bergen as Anthony Radziwiłł, John's cousin and close friend
- Tonatiuh as Narciso Rodriguez, a stylist and Carolyn's friend
- Noah Fearnley as Michael Bergin, a model and Carolyn's boyfriend prior to meeting John
- Omari K. Chancellor as Gordon Henderson, a stylist and Carolyn's friend
- Aida Leventaki as Jane, Calvin Klein's secretary
- Michael Nathanson as Michael Berman, John's business partner and friend

=== Guest ===
- Dree Hemingway as Daryl Hannah, John's girlfriend prior to meeting Carolyn
- Adam Grupper as Maurice Tempelsman, Jackie's companion and caretaker
- Donal Logue as Ted Kennedy, John's uncle
- Constance Zimmer as Ann Messina Freeman, Carolyn's mother
- Jessica Harper as Ethel Kennedy, John's aunt
- Grey Henson as Tommy, John's friend
- Aaron Dean Eisenberg as Colin, John's friend

== Production ==
=== Development ===
On August 13, 2021, it was announced that FX had ordered a new spin-off series American Love Story. The first season would cover the "whirlwind courtship and marriage of John F. Kennedy Jr. and Carolyn Bessette-Kennedy," ending with their deaths in a private plane crash in 1999.

In June 2025, Jack Schlossberg, nephew of John F. Kennedy Jr., criticized the series for not consulting the Kennedy family during development and accused the production of "profiting off" his uncle's life "in a grotesque way." He urged the show's creators to donate part of its proceeds to the John F. Kennedy Library. Murphy later stated he intended to make a donation. In July 2025, Murphy remarked that it was an "odd choice to be mad about your relative that you don't remember," prompting Schlossberg to share personal memories of his uncle on Instagram and reiterate his criticism that the project was exploiting his family's history for profit.

=== Casting ===
In March 2025, it was reported that Sarah Pidgeon would be playing Carolyn Bessette-Kennedy. In May 2025, it was reported that Naomi Watts would play Jackie Kennedy, while newcomer Paul Kelly would lead the series as John F. Kennedy, Jr. In June 2025, Grace Gummer, Sydney Lemmon, and Alessandro Nivola joined the cast. In a series regular role, Gummer would portray Caroline Kennedy. In recurring roles, Lemmon would portray Lauren Bessette and Nivola would play Calvin Klein. On June 13, 2025, Ryan Murphy shared a first look at Paul Kelly and Sarah Pidgeon as John F. Kennedy Jr. and Carolyn Bessette on his Instagram. The same day, it was announced by Murphy that Leila George and Noah Fearnley had joined the cast as Kelly Klein and Michael Bergin. In July 2025, Omari K. Chancellor joined the cast of the series, now titled Love Story, in a recurring role as Gordon Henderson. In November 2025, Constance Zimmer joined the cast in a recurring role as Carolyn's mother Ann Messina Freeman.

=== Filming ===
Principal photography on the series began in June 2025. With Kennedy having lived at 20 North Moore Street in Tribeca, many exterior shots were filmed around there, including in the historic 53–55 Beach Street, and throughout Tribeca and Soho. The scenes at Cape Cod were shot in Bellport, Long Island.

== Episodes ==
No.	Title	Directed by	Written by	Original release date
1	"Pilot"	Max Winkler	Connor Hines	February 12, 2026
In 1999, John F. Kennedy Jr. and his wife Carolyn board a plane with Carolyn's sister Lauren. Seven years earlier, Carolyn is an ambitious saleswoman at Calvin Klein, while John stresses about failing the New York bar exam a second time and disappointing his mother Jackie and sister Caroline with his turbulent personal life. Carolyn dresses Annette Bening for the Bugsy premiere, earning her Calvin's favor. Calvin introduces John and Carolyn at a fundraiser. John visits Carolyn at her workplace, has her measure him for a new suit, and invites her out to dinner. Although John arrives half an hour late, the two bond over their lives and kiss. John's on-off girlfriend Daryl Hannah returns to New York, despite Jackie's dislike. Carolyn selects Kate Moss's headshot for an upcoming campaign and sees a headline proclaiming that John and Daryl are back together.
2	"The Pools Party"	Jesse Peretz	Connor Hines	February 12, 2026
Carolyn, now a publicist, ignores John's overtures. John tries to launch George, despite skepticism from prospective partners and Jackie, who has suffered a horseback riding accident. Daryl visits John on the set of an advert, drawing the paparazzi's attention. At a book launch for Calvin's wife Kelly, Carolyn rebuffs John. He returns home and argues with Daryl. Calvin Klein seeks to replace Mark Wahlberg as the face of an ongoing campaign following a scandal, and Carolyn suggests her boyfriend Michael Bergin. Jackie backs out of a family dinner with Daryl, causing the latter to confront John about the state of their relationship and leave for Los Angeles. Their dog Hank is killed on a walk, and John flies to LA with its ashes. Jackie collapses.
3	"America's Widow"	Jesse Peretz	Connor Hines	February 12, 2026
After her hospitalization, Jackie reflects on her life, speaks with her children, and tries to get her affairs in order. John — needing respite despite being aware of her relationship with Michael — asks Carolyn to meet him at a park, and she consoles him. Rather than pursue an aggressive treatment after learning her cancer has spread, Jackie elects to die at home with her children, prompting a nationwide outpouring of grief. John hosts the wake and becomes uncomfortable with Daryl's attendance. An anguished John arrives at Carolyn's apartment, where she comforts and kisses him.
4	"I Love You"	Gillian Robespierre	D.V. DeVincentis	February 19, 2026
Carolyn and John revel in their early-relationship bliss, though Carolyn fears the relationship being revealed to the public. John takes Carolyn on a romantic trip to Breezy Point and successfully introduces Carolyn to his friends. He brings Carolyn to a party hosted by his sister unannounced, but fails to mention that it is a dinner celebrating Caroline's birthday, causing awkwardness. John finds a letter in his bag claiming that Carolyn had a sordid past and had been plotting to ingratiate herself into his life; she is deeply offended when he confronts her about it and breaks things off. After speaking with Caroline about his immaturity, John apologizes to Carolyn. The two admit their mutual love and reconcile. The next day, Carolyn's identity and trip with John make tabloid headlines.
5	"Battery Park"	Crystle Roberson Dorsey	Kim Rosenstock	February 26, 2026
John and Carolyn now live together and co-own a dog, Friday. Despite Michael's stress about George's upcoming launch, John brings Carolyn to a weekend with the extended Kennedy family in Hyannis Port. The de facto matriarch, Ethel, is unimpressed with Carolyn, who feels increasingly unwelcome. John privately proposes to Carolyn, but she turns him down as she is not yet sure how they fit into each other's lives. News of the proposal is leaked to the press, overshadowing the magazine launch. John publicly denies the proposal, offending Carolyn. The stresses cause the couple to have a public, well-photographed fight in Battery Park. They calm down enough to have a sincere conversation about their situation, and Carolyn agrees to marry John.
6	"The Wedding"	Gillian Robespierre	Juli Weiner	March 5, 2026
The engagement is met with skepticism from both families. Wanting an intimate wedding in a rustic venue, John and Carolyn plan to marry on Cumberland Island. In an attempt to appease Caroline, Carolyn names her maid of honor over Lauren, upsetting the latter. Carolyn has her friend Narciso Rodriguez design her wedding dress and quits her job, disappointing the recently separated Calvin. Carolyn's mother Ann voices her concerns about John and hopes that Carolyn will not shrink in her marriage. Because Narciso needs to sew Carolyn into the dress, the ceremony is delayed. Ultimately, John and Carolyn wed happily and depart for their honeymoon.
7	"Obsession"	Crystle Roberson Dorsey	Connor Hines	March 12, 2026
Upon returning from their honeymoon, John and Carolyn are faced with hordes of media attention. Carolyn successfully interviews for Ralph Lauren but realizes she cannot work there upon seeing the paparazzi waiting outside. Despite worsening financial straits, John refuses to use his marriage to benefit George. He learns that his cousin and best friend Anthony's cancer has returned. During a party hosted by Caroline, John lambasts her husband Ed for pitching him as a narrator of a JFK-centered documentary without his permission, and shuts down a political career. Meanwhile, Carolyn takes one of Caroline's daughters downstairs, exposing her to paparazzi and spurring an argument with Caroline. Two months later, Caroline and John have a conciliatory lunch, and Carolyn has become more reclusive. Lauren remarks that the press will always be seeking drama in their marriage. An exhausted Carolyn breaks down in John's arms. John and Michael have a physical fight over their management of George that results in Michael quitting, prompting John to meet with a political consultant.
8	"Exit Strategy"	Jesse Peretz	Connor Hines and Juli Weiner	March 19, 2026
Carolyn, still largely confined to the apartment, is rattled by the death of Diana, Princess of Wales from being chased by paparazzi. A year later, a recently injured John is trying to become a certified pilot, and the relationship between him and Carolyn has deteriorated. Carolyn detests John's constant attempts at helping her find a job and thinks he has lost interest in her. John accuses her of not wanting to do anything with her life and lording her misfortunes over him. Fed up with the fighting and the feeling that he is failing in their marriage, John leaves for Stanhope despite Carolyn's pleas.
9	"Search and Recovery"	Anthony Hemingway	Connor Hines	March 26, 2026
Now living apart, John and Carolyn attend marriage counseling. They sleep together and reminisce about their relationship, but later backslide into arguing. After Caroline and Lauren separately advise John and Carolyn on their marriage, Carolyn attends a gala for George, delighting John. Having entered a tentative peace, the two discuss their relationship. She agrees to go to the wedding of John's cousin Rory with him. John plans to fly Lauren and Carolyn in a small aircraft. The flight goes awry, and the plane goes missing near Martha's Vineyard. Their families are informed of the disappearance and, later, confirmed deaths. Ann rejects the Kennedys' suggestions for the burials, but later bonds with Caroline over their shared loss. Caroline suggests cremating the three and spreading their ashes over the sea, to which Ann agrees.

== Release ==
Love Story premiered on FX and FX on Hulu on February 12, 2026. Internationally, the series was made available to stream on Disney+.

== Reception ==
=== Viewership ===
John F. Kennedy Jr. & Carolyn Bessette accumulated more than 25 million hours of viewing across Hulu and Disney+ for its first five episodes. FX announced that this represented the highest streaming total for a limited series in the network's history and made it its most-watched limited series on both platforms. Viewership for the fifth episode was reported to be 51% higher than that of the premiere. The series also prompted increased activity on TikTok following its release. Searches for John F. Kennedy Jr. and Carolyn Bessette-Kennedy reportedly increased by more than 9,100% in the month after the premiere, while the hashtag #lovestory generated more than 21 million posts globally. John F. Kennedy Jr. & Carolyn Bessette subsequently surpassed 65 million hours streamed across Hulu and Disney+. Its season finale achieved a series high on both platforms, with viewership increasing by nearly 20% from the preceding episode and approximately 90% above the premiere after its first day of availability.

=== Critical response ===
Metacritic review
breakdown (unweighted)

Positive
13 (54%)
Mixed
11 (46%)
Negative
0 (0%)

On the review aggregator website Rotten Tomatoes, Love Story: John F. Kennedy Jr. & Carolyn Bessette holds an approval rating of 80%, based on 50 critics' reviews, with an average rating of 6.7/10. The website's critics consensus reads: "Ryan Murphy's Love Story finds a winning pair in Paul Anthony Kelly and Sarah Pidgeon as they embody the tragic, lovely, and shining aspects of John F. Kennedy Jr. & Carolyn Bessette in a mindful yet entertaining new series." Metacritic, which uses a weighted average, assigned a score of 63 out of 100, based on 24 critics, indicating "generally favorable" reviews.

Sarah Pidgeon received praise for her performance as Bessette-Kennedy, with Nicholas Quah of Vulture writing, "Carolyn is the closest thing the show has to a genuinely inhabited character: quick and curious, existentially adrift but committed to selfhood, carrying an undercurrent of anxiety about the world she's entered that the script only intermittently knows what to do with." Critics compared the series to The Crown, with Judy Berman of Time writing both shows depict the "ultimate gilded cage—what perpetual scrutiny does to a family compelled to prioritize appearances over relationships, tradition over love".

However, writers commented that Love Story finds nothing new or insightful to say about its central couple or the Kennedys as an institution. Berman wrote: "For all its flaws, The Crown balanced its royal characters' travails with bigger questions [...] Love Story shows no interest in understanding what the Kennedys meant, and still mean, to a nation that prided itself on having no kings but elevated this particular dynasty as a surrogate royal family. That's a shame, especially as heirs whose affiliations range from the far right to the young left continue to drive American politics. If the people we put on pedestals are mirrors for society, then what did the Kennedys say about us in the 1960s? The '90s? Today?"

In The New Yorker, Doreen St. Félix wrote the series' "Wikipedia-page-like narrowness on the doomed romance excises all that contemporary drama—President Bill Clinton invoking J.F.K. as a forefather, Ted Kennedy, the brother of J.F.K. and R.F.K., recovering from the scandal of Chappaquiddick and the humiliation of a failed Presidential run to become the 'lion' of the Senate—that makes the Kennedy story, one of a relationship to a greater culture". Quah added "Love Story [...] is so tightly focused on the relationship [between Carolyn and John Jr.] that nine episodes of emotional trivialities begin to feel indulgent [...] In flattening the rhythms of Kennedy and Bessette's life together into a cycle of domestic discord, Love Story takes a relationship long freighted with myth, glamour, and cultural obsession and renders it strangely ordinary".

=== Response from depicted figures ===
In March 2026, actress Daryl Hannah, who is portrayed as a character in the series, criticized Love Story in a guest essay in The New York Times. She wrote that the show's depiction of her was "not even a remotely accurate representation of my life, my conduct or my relationship with John", and said it falsely attributed behavior to her that never occurred, including hosting cocaine-fueled parties, pressuring John F. Kennedy Jr. into marriage, and planting stories in the press.

=== Accolades ===
Year	Award	Category	Recipient(s)	Result	Ref.
2026	AAFCA TV Honors	Best Limited Series	Love Story: John F. Kennedy Jr. & Carolyn Bessette	Honored	
2026	AAFCA TV Honors	Best Directing (Drama)	Crystle Roberson Dorsey	Honored	
2026	Astra TV Awards	Best Actor in a Limited Series or TV Movie	Paul Anthony Kelly	Nominated	
2026	Astra TV Awards	Best Actress in a Limited Series or TV Movie	Sarah Pidgeon	Nominated	
2026	Astra TV Awards	Best Supporting Actress in a Limited Series or TV Movie	Grace Gummer	Nominated	
2026	Black Reel TV Awards	Outstanding Directing in a TV Movie or Limited Series	Crystle Roberson Dorsey (for "Battery Park")	Nominated	
2026	Dorian TV Awards	Best TV Movie or Limited Series	Love Story: John F. Kennedy Jr. & Carolyn Bessette	Nominated	
2026	Golden Trailer Awards	Best BTS/EPK for a TV/Streaming Series (over 2 minutes)	"A Love Untold – The Wedding" (FX / Intermission Film)	Nominated	
2026	Golden Trailer Awards	Best Drama Trailer for a TV/Streaming Series	"Heart" (FX / GrandSon)	Nominated	
2026	Golden Trailer Awards	Best Music (Trailer/Teaser) – TV/Streaming Series	"Waves" (FX / GrandSon)	Nominated	
2026	Gotham TV Awards	Outstanding Lead Performance in a Limited or Anthology Series	Sarah Pidgeon	Nominated	
2026	Gotham TV Awards	Ensemble Tribute	Grace Gummer, Paul Anthony Kelly, Alessandro Nivola, Sarah Pidgeon, Ben Shenkman, Naomi Watts, and Constance Zimmer	Honored	
2026	Primetime Emmy Awards	Outstanding Limited or Anthology Series	Ryan Murphy, Nina Jacobson, Brad Simpson, Connor Hines, Eric Kovtun, Nissa Diederich, Scott Robertson, Monica Levinson, Kim Rosenstock, Tanase Popa, Karl Frankenfield, Todd Kubrak, Sara Stelwagen, Todd Nenninger, Lou Eyrich, Checka Propper, Juli Weiner, and Adam Penn	Nominated	
2026	Primetime Emmy Awards	Outstanding Lead Actress in a Limited or Anthology Series or Movie	Sarah Pidgeon	Nominated	
2026	Primetime Creative Arts Emmy Awards	Outstanding Supporting Actress in a Limited or Anthology Series or Movie	Constance Zimmer	Nominated	
2026	Primetime Creative Arts Emmy Awards	Outstanding Casting for a Limited or Anthology Series or Movie	Courtney Bright, Nicole Daniels, and Jennifer Brooks	Won	
2026	Primetime Creative Arts Emmy Awards	Outstanding Period Costumes	Rudy Mance, Natalie Turturro Mettouchi, Brittany Griffin, Moria Clinton, and Liz Samuels (for "The Wedding")	Nominated	
2026	Primetime Creative Arts Emmy Awards	Outstanding Period or Fantasy/Sci-Fi Makeup (Non-Prosthetic)	Milagros Medina-Cerdeira, Blair Aycock, D'angelo Thompson, and Jill Karol (for "The Pools Party")	Nominated	
2026	Primetime Creative Arts Emmy Awards	Outstanding Short Form Nonfiction or Reality Series (Note: Specifically for Love Story: John F. Kennedy Jr. & Carolyn Bessette – A Love Untold)	Ryan Murphy, Tanase Popa, Stephanie Gibbons, Sally Daws, Kenna McCabe, and Melanie Pimentel	Nominated	
2026	Set Decorators Society of America TV Awards	Best Achievement in Décor/Design of a Television Movie or Limited Series	Lydia Marks and Alex DiGerlando	Nominated	
2026	TCA Awards	Outstanding Achievement in Movies, Miniseries, or Specials	Love Story: John F. Kennedy Jr. & Carolyn Bessette	Nominated	

== See also ==
- American Prince: JFK Jr. – 2025 documentary series on John F. Kennedy Jr.
