= 1999 Martha's Vineyard plane crash =

1999 aircraft accident in the Atlantic Ocean

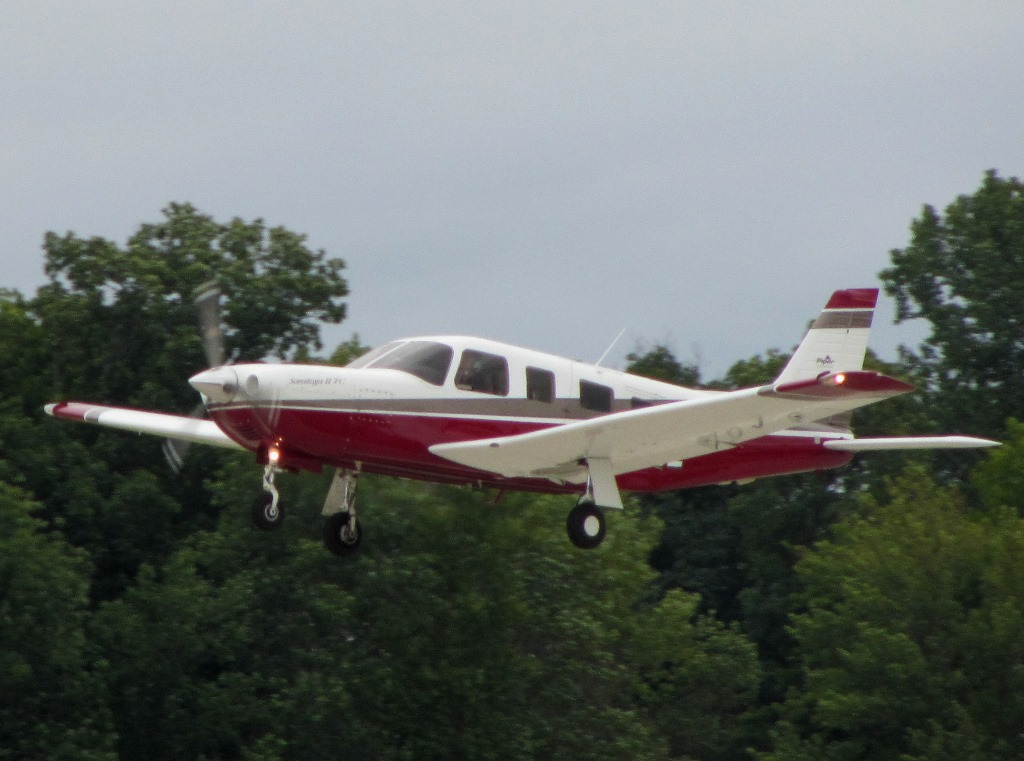
- A Piper PA-32R-301 Saratoga II, similar to the one involved in the accident

Accident
- Date: July 16, 1999
- Summary: Loss of control in marginal VMC due to pilot error and spatial disorientation
- Site: Atlantic Ocean, off the west coast of Martha's Vineyard, Massachusetts, U.S.; 41°17′37″N 70°58′39″W

Aircraft
- Aircraft type: Piper PA-32R-301 Saratoga II
- Operator: Private
- Call sign: SARATOGA 9253 NOVEMBER
- Registration: N9253N
- Flight origin: Essex County Airport, New Jersey
- Stopover: Martha's Vineyard Airport, Massachusetts
- Destination: Barnstable Municipal Airport, Massachusetts
- Occupants: 3
- Passengers: 2
- Crew: 1
- Fatalities: 3
- Survivors: 0

On July 16, 1999, John F. Kennedy Jr. died when the light aircraft he was piloting crashed into the Atlantic Ocean off Martha's Vineyard, Massachusetts. Kennedy's wife, Carolyn Bessette Kennedy, and sister-in-law, Lauren Bessette, were also on board and died. The Piper Saratoga departed from New Jersey's Essex County Airport; its intended route was along the coastline of Connecticut and across Rhode Island Sound to Martha's Vineyard Airport.

The official investigation by the National Transportation Safety Board (NTSB) concluded that Kennedy fell victim to spatial disorientation while descending over water at night and lost control of his plane. Kennedy did not hold an instrument rating and therefore he was only certified to fly under visual flight rules (VFR). At the time of Kennedy's death, the weather and light conditions were such that all basic landmarks were obscured, making visual flight challenging, although legally still permissible.

== Background ==
On the evening of July 16, 1999, John F. Kennedy Jr. piloted a Piper Saratoga to attend the wedding of his cousin Rory to Mark Bailey at the Kennedy Compound in Hyannis Port, Massachusetts scheduled the following day. The plane also carried Kennedy's wife, Carolyn, and her sister, Lauren Bessette. Lauren was to be dropped off at Martha's Vineyard Airport and the Kennedys would continue on to Barnstable Municipal Airport. Kennedy had bought his plane three months before the crash. The sisters were seated in the second row of seats, which faced the rear of the plane, back-to-back with the pilot's seat.

=== Aircraft ===
The aircraft, N9253N, was a 4-year-old Piper PA-32R-301 or Saratoga II HP "High Performance" manufactured in June 1995 with the serial number 32R-8013065. It had flown 664 hours and was equipped with a Hartzell three-blade single propeller powered by a Lycoming IO-540-K1G5 engine.

== Timeline of events ==
=== Flight ===
Kennedy checked in with the air traffic control tower at Martha's Vineyard Airport before his departure. At 8:38 p.m. on Friday, July 16, 1999, Kennedy departed from New Jersey's Essex County Airport, 21 miles (34 km) west of Midtown Manhattan. At about 9:41 p.m., Kennedy's plane crashed nearly nose first into the Atlantic Ocean though the particular details of the incident were unknown until after investigation. At 10:05 p.m., a clerical-duties summer intern contacted the Federal Aviation Administration (FAA) office in Bridgeport, Connecticut, about Kennedy's failure to arrive, but the intern was told that no information could be released to him over the phone.

=== Coast Guard notified ===
At 2:15 a.m. on July 17, the Kennedy family reported to the Coast Guard Air Station at Cape Cod that the plane had not arrived. At 4 a.m., the United States Coast Guard began a search and rescue operation. Kennedy's cousin Anthony Radziwiłł told the press that if Kennedy were still alive, "He'll find a way to get out. He possesses the will to survive, enough will for all three of them." Officials were not optimistic about finding Kennedy alive after several pieces of debris from his plane were recovered from the ocean. "There is always hope," Coast Guard Lt. Gary Jones said. "But unfortunately, when you find certain pieces of evidence, you have to be prepared for anything."

=== President Clinton's response ===
President Bill Clinton spoke with Kennedy's older sister, Caroline, and paternal uncle, Ted. Clinton also spoke to Housing and Urban Development Secretary Andrew Cuomo, who was married to Kennedy's paternal cousin, Kerry. "He wanted to let them know he was thinking about them, that we'll do everything we can, and that our prayers are with them," Clinton spokesman Joe Lockhart said. Clinton responded by ordering U.S. Navy warships to assist in the search for Kennedy's plane. Critics argued that the search was an abuse of taxpayer dollars, as no ordinary citizen would receive similar treatment. Clinton said that the Kennedys had "suffered much, and given more," and he called for them to feel "the strength of God, the love of their friends and the prayers of their fellow citizens."

=== Debris and bodies recovered ===
Only after civilian Scott Gerber found debris while sailing did the NOAA vessel Rude locate fragments of Kennedy's plane using side-scan sonar. Rude captured high-resolution images which were used to create a three-dimensional map of the ocean's floor. At 11:30 p.m. on July 20, the salvage ship USNS Grasp identified the plane's fuselage. Navy divers found parts of the plane strewn over a broad area of seabed 120 feet (37 m) below the surface, approximately 7.5 miles (12.1 km) west of Martha's Vineyard.

On the afternoon of July 21, divers reportedly found the Bessette sisters' bodies near the fuselage; Kennedy's body was still strapped into his seat. However, Coast Guard Admiral Richard M. Larrabee said that all three bodies were "near and under" the fuselage, still strapped in. The bodies were taken to the county medical examiner's office by motorcade. Autopsies on the evening of July 21 performed by the county medical examiner found that all three had died upon impact. At the same time, the Kennedy and Bessette families announced their plans for memorial services. After the autopsies were completed, the three bodies were taken from Hyannis to Duxbury, Massachusetts, where they were cremated in the Mayflower Cemetery crematorium.

== Investigation ==
The National Transportation Safety Board (NTSB) officially declared that Kennedy's plane had crashed into the Atlantic Ocean off the coast of Martha's Vineyard. The probable cause of the crash was "the pilot's failure to maintain control of the airplane during a descent over water at night, which was a result of spatial disorientation". Under the heading "Spatial Disorientation", the report listed, from the FAA Instrument Flying Handbook Advisory Circular 61-27C, six examples:

- The leans
- Coriolis illusion
- Graveyard spiral
- Inversion illusion
- Elevator illusion
- Autokinesis

Kennedy was not qualified to fly his plane by "instruments only". The crash occurred in conditions not legally requiring such qualification.

=== Possible contributing factors ===
Haze and visibility

Atmospheric conditions along Kennedy's flight path on the night of the crash were occasionally hazy, which can lead to spatial disorientation for pilots. Other pilots flying similar routes on the night of the crash reported no visual horizon due to haze. The weather was officially listed as "visual meteorological conditions" (VMC), which allowed Kennedy to fly under Visual Flight Rules (VFR) rather than Instrument Flight Rules (IFR), especially since he lacked an instrument rating. The visibility was very poor in Essex County, New Jersey and airports along Kennedy's flight path reported visibility between five and eight miles with haze and a few clouds. Also, the NTSB reported on one pilot who cancelled a similar flight that evening due to "poor" weather. The conditions near the crash site were: "Clear skies at or below 12,000 feet; visibility 10 miles".

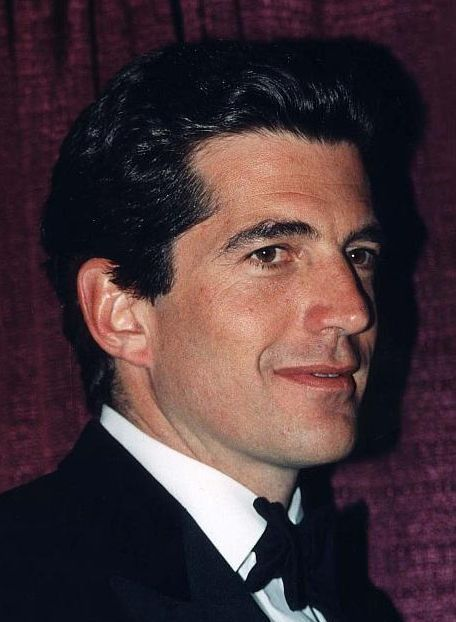
Pilot, John Kennedy Jr, 1999

Pilot experience

Kennedy first obtained his private pilot license in 1998 and received "high performance airplane" and "complex airplane" endorsements two months before the crash. His estimated total flight experience before the crash was about 310 hours, of which 55 hours were at night. His estimated flight time in the accident airplane was about 36 hours, of which about nine hours were at night. About three hours of that flight time were without a Certified Flight Instructor (CFI) on board, and only 48 minutes of that time was flown at night, which included a night landing.

It is not clear how much of Kennedy's total flight experience was in the plane type that crashed or in his other more basic plane, the Cessna Skylane 182. In the 15 months before the crash, Kennedy had flown about 35 flights either to or from northern New Jersey and the Martha's Vineyard area. Kennedy flew more than 17 of these legs without a CFI on board, including at least five at night. His last known flight in his airplane without a CFI on board happened two months before the crash.

Pilot training

The CFI who prepared Kennedy for his private pilot checkride stated that he had "very good" flying skills for his level of experience. Four months before the crash, Kennedy passed the FAA's written airplane instrument examination and later enrolled in an instrument rating course. He continued to receive flight instruction in New Jersey in his plane, including flights from CDW to MVY. His instructors said Kennedy required help working the rudder pedals to taxi and land the plane because of his ankle injury.

During a training flight at night under instrument conditions, his instructor stated that Kennedy had the ability to fly the airplane without a visible horizon but may have experienced difficulty performing additional tasks under such conditions. He also stated that the pilot was not ready for an instrument evaluation and needed additional training. The instructor at the time of the crash was not aware that Kennedy would be flying in those conditions without an instructor on board. The CFI further stated that he had talked to Kennedy on the night of the accident and offered to fly with him that night. He stated that Kennedy had the capability to conduct a night flight to Martha's Vineyard as long as a visible horizon existed.

==== Pilot distraction ====
From 8:49 p.m., about ten minutes after departure, and for a five-minute period lasting until 8:54 p.m., Kennedy's plane flew in the same vicinity as American Airlines Flight 1484, a Fokker 100, which was on approach to Westchester County Airport (HPN). The traffic collision avoidance system (TCAS) sounded on the Fokker 100, leading to some discussion between the Fokker and the New York approach controller (ATC). However, the interaction ended with American Airlines Flight 1484 reporting to ATC that they believed the other plane was a Piper and that the TCAS warning was resolved. No corrective action was reported to have been taken by ATC nor Flight 1484. It is not known if Kennedy was aware of, or distracted by, the incident.

==== Late departure ====
The flight was originally scheduled for daylight hours but had to be postponed after Kennedy's sister-in-law was delayed at work. Heavy traffic further delayed Kennedy's flight and pushed it back until after dark. Originally planned to depart at 6:00 p.m., Kennedy's plane departed at 8:39 p.m. instead, nearly a half-hour past sunset. At the time of the takeoff, the moon was just above the horizon and provided very little illumination.

==== No flight plan or request for help ====
Kennedy never received a weather briefing or filed a flight plan with any Flight Service Station. Except for the take-off portion of his flight, Kennedy did not contact any air traffic controllers; during the flight, he never requested help or declared an emergency. Under the conditions of his flight, Kennedy was not required to file a flight plan, and because he did not, no one knew his exact route or expected time of his arrival. According to the Weather Service International, as reported in the investigation by the NTSB, Kennedy made two weather requests before taking off. The information he was provided indicated that visibility ranged from ten miles (16 km) along his route to four miles (6 km) at Martha's Vineyard.

==== Flight over featureless, open water ====
Locations of the departure and destination airports

Shortly after passing Point Judith, Rhode Island, Kennedy's plane headed directly towards Martha's Vineyard. Instead of following the coastline of Rhode Island Sound and Buzzards Bay, which would have provided visible lights on the ground, Kennedy chose the shorter, direct path over a 30-mile (50 km) open stretch of water. According to the FAA Airplane Flying Handbook, crossing large bodies of water at night may be very hazardous, not only from the standpoint of ditching in the water but also because the featureless horizon visually blends with the water, in which case depth perception and orientation become difficult.

==== Foot injury ====
Six weeks before the crash, Kennedy had fractured his left ankle in a paragliding accident over the Memorial Day weekend. He had surgery and wore a cast which was removed just the day before the fatal flight. He still walked with a limp on the day of the accident. During his interviews, Kennedy's orthopaedic surgeon stated that, at the time of the crash, he would have been able to apply the type of pressure that would normally be required to drive a car.

==== Incorrect radio frequencies ====
While the NTSB examined the wreckage, they soon discovered that both of Kennedy's radios had incorrect frequencies selected. Kennedy had selected 127.25 for Martha Vineyard's ATIS (automated weather information) instead of 126.25; likewise, he selected 135.25 for Essex County ATIS but it should have been 135.5. The NTSB declined to comment on the contribution this factor had in the crash, if any.

== Aftermath ==
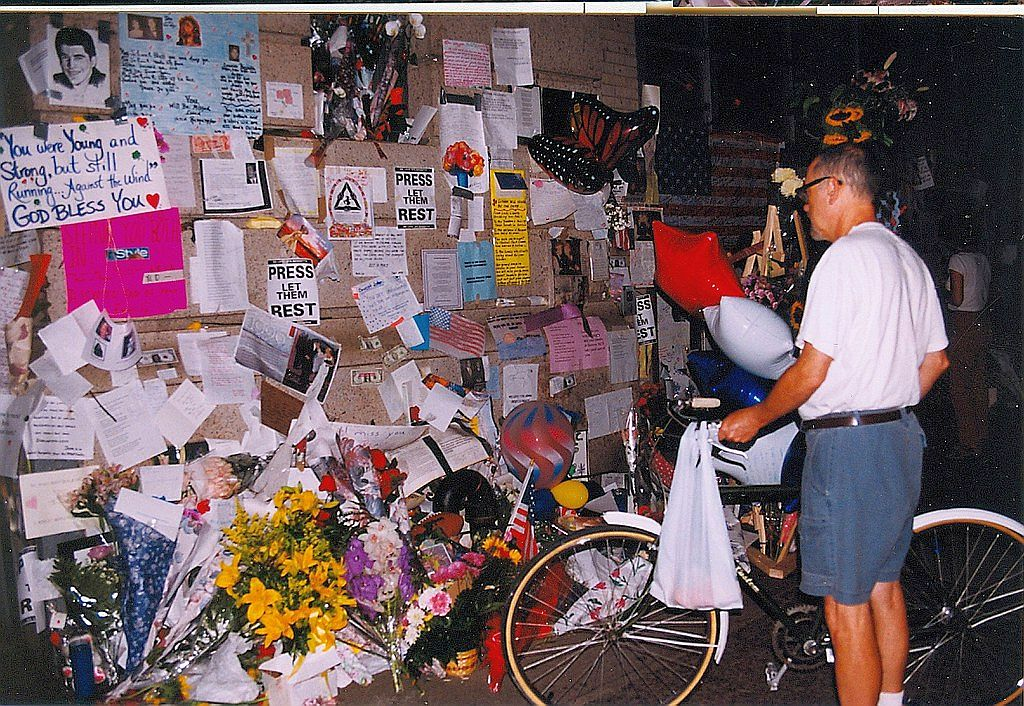
Mourners outside Kennedy's apartment house

On the morning of July 22, relatives brought the cremated remains of Kennedy onto USS Briscoe. His ashes were later scattered into the Atlantic Ocean off the coast of Martha's Vineyard. The ship was used for the public memorial service with the permission of U.S. Secretary of Defense William Cohen. Briscoe spent about half an hour off the Vineyard's southwest coast, and was approximately 2.5 miles from the crash site.

President Clinton ordered that the flag at the White House be lowered to half-staff to honor Kennedy. During a public memorial service for Kennedy, his paternal uncle, Senator Ted Kennedy, stated:

We dared to think, in that other Irish phrase, that this John Kennedy would live to comb gray hair, with his beloved Carolyn by his side. But, like his father, he had every gift but length of years.

Ted Kennedy also used the term that had been said about his brother's presidency, saying that "for a thousand days, he was a husband who adored the wife who became his perfect soulmate."

Kennedy's last will and testament, signed 18 months before his death, stipulated that all of his personal belongings, property, and holdings were to be "evenly distributed" among his two nieces, Rose and Tatiana, and nephew, Jack, who were among 14 beneficiaries in the will.

== Popular culture ==
- The final season 1 episode of the Canadian TV Series Final 24 explores the details of Kennedy's life and death, and the events surrounding the plane crash.
- In the 2019 alternate history short story "Election Day" by Harry Turtledove, John F. Kennedy, Jr.'s wife Carolyn convinces him not to fly them out to Martha's Vineyard on that night, and both survive.
- It is featured in season 2, episode 4, of the TV show Why Planes Crash, in an episode called "Small Planes, Big Problems".
- The crash is featured in season 14, episode 6 of the Canadian TV show Mayday called "The Death of JFK Jr." and in season 2, episode 8 of Air Crash Investigation Special Report called "Deadly Confusion".
- An aircraft similar to the one involved in the crash was depicted in the final scenes of The Kennedys: After Camelot. In the seasons epilogue, Carolyn Bessette Kennedy (Erica Cox) is seen promising to stand by her husband John (Brett Donahue), if he decides to run for the White House.
- The crash is featured in the first season of the 2026 television series Love Story, which details the whirlwind courtship and marriage of Kennedy (played by Paul Anthony Kelly) and Carolyn Bessette-Kennedy (played by Sarah Pidgeon).

== See also ==
- Kennedy curse – summarizes a series of unfortunate and tragic events involving members of the Kennedy family
