= Carolyn Bessette Kennedy =

Wife of John F. Kennedy Jr. (1966–1999)

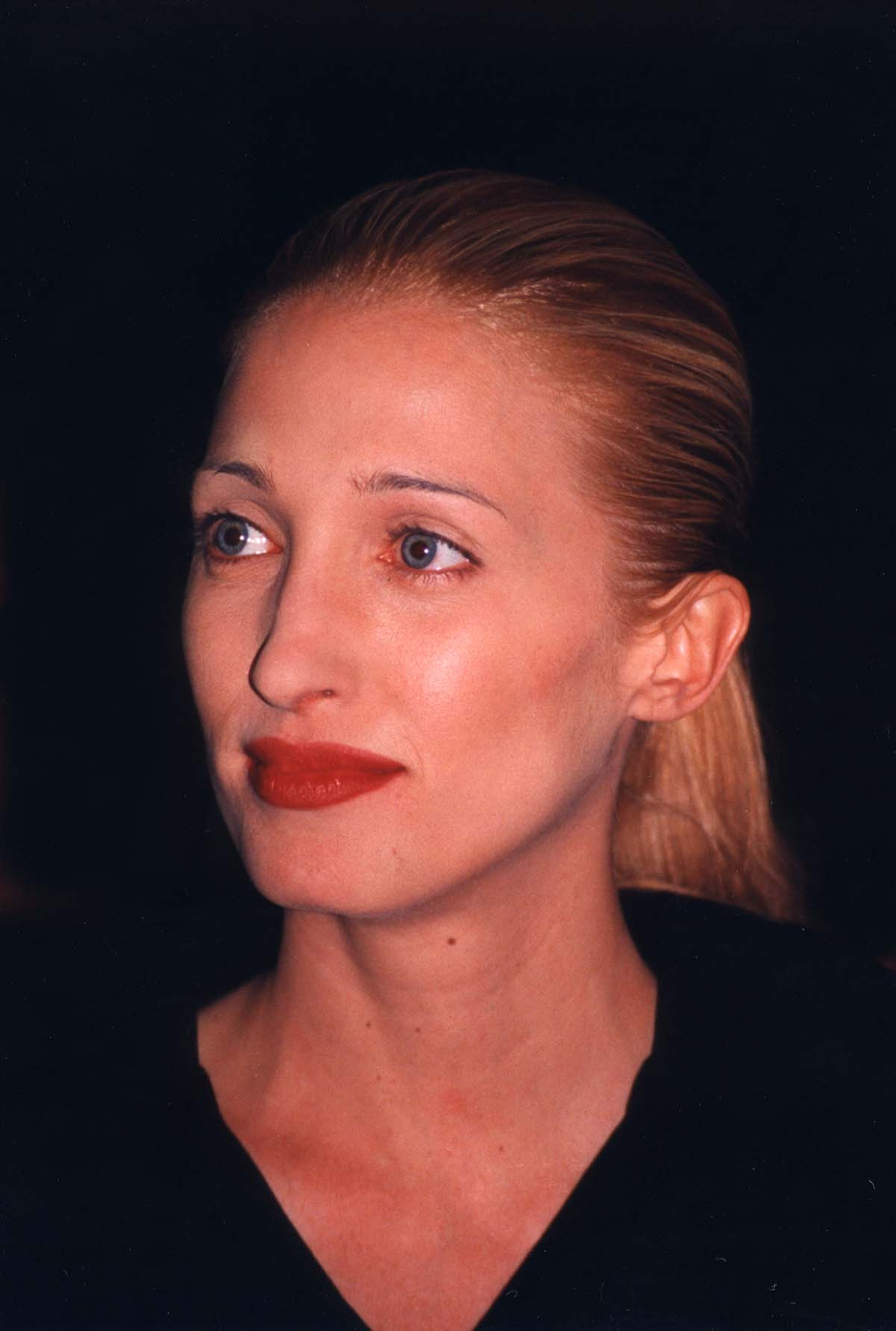
- Bessette-Kennedy at the White House Correspondents' Dinner in May 1999
- Born: Carolyn Jeanne Bessette; January 7, 1966; White Plains, New York, U.S.
- Died: July 16, 1999 (aged 33); Atlantic Ocean, near Martha's Vineyard, U.S.
- Cause of death: Plane crash
- Education: Boston University (BA)
- Occupation: Publicist
- Spouse: John F. Kennedy Jr. (m. 1996)
- Relatives: Lauren Bessette (sister); Kennedy family (by marriage); Bouvier family (by marriage)

Carolyn Jeanne Bessette-Kennedy (née Bessette; January 7, 1966 – July 16, 1999) was an American fashion publicist. Raised in Greenwich, Connecticut, she graduated from Boston University and joined Calvin Klein, where she rose from a sales position in Boston to publicity and show-production roles in New York. In 1996, she married attorney and publisher John F. Kennedy Jr., the son of President John F. Kennedy and Jacqueline Kennedy Onassis.

Bessette-Kennedy's marriage brought her under intense press scrutiny. Reporters and photographers followed the couple in New York, while fashion magazines closely covered her clothes and public appearances. Her restrained personal style, associated with 1990s minimalism, drew attention during her lifetime.

On July 16, 1999, Bessette-Kennedy, her husband, and her older sister Lauren Bessette died when the plane he was piloting crashed into the Atlantic Ocean near Martha's Vineyard, Massachusetts. After her death, designers and fashion writers cited her as an influence, while memoirs, biographies, documentaries, and a 2026 television series covered her life and marriage.

== Early life and education ==
Carolyn Jeanne Bessette was born on January 7, 1966, in White Plains, New York, to William Bessette, an architectural engineer and cabinetmaker, and Ann Messina, a school administrator. She was the youngest of three daughters; her older sisters, Lauren and Lisa Ann, were twins. Her parents divorced when she was young, and her mother later married Richard Freeman, an orthopedic surgeon. Bessette grew up in Greenwich, Connecticut, and was raised Catholic. She was of French-Canadian and Italian ancestry.

Bessette attended Greenwich High School before transferring to St. Mary's High School in Greenwich, from which she graduated in 1983. At St. Mary's, classmates voted her the "Ultimate Beautiful Person". She then attended Boston University's School of Education, graduating in January 1988 with a degree in elementary education. While at Boston University, Bessette briefly pursued modeling, hired a photographer for a professional portfolio, and appeared on the cover of the 1988 calendar The Girls of B.U.

== Career ==
After graduating from Boston University, Bessette briefly worked as a nightclub promoter in Boston before joining Calvin Klein's store at the Chestnut Hill Mall in Newton, Massachusetts. A traveling sales coordinator at the Boston store recommended her to Susan Sokol, then a senior executive at Calvin Klein, who brought her to New York to work with the company's private clients. Her clients included Diane Sawyer, Blaine Trump, and Annette Bening, who ordered privately from Klein's showroom.

Bessette spent seven years at Calvin Klein, rising from sales work in Boston to celebrity sales, public relations, and show-production roles in New York. Paul Wilmot, Calvin Klein's former director of publicity, said that Bessette's job required both fashion judgment and attention to administrative detail. By the time she left the company in the spring of 1996, she was director of show production and earned a salary in the low six figures.

== Relationship and marriage to John F. Kennedy Jr. ==
Bessette met John F. Kennedy Jr., the son of former U.S. President John F. Kennedy and former First Lady Jacqueline Kennedy Onassis, in the early 1990s. Reports differed on how they met. Several placed their first meeting at Calvin Klein, but The Boston Globe wrote in 1999 that neither had publicly said where or how they met. They began dating in 1994, and Bessette moved into Kennedy's Tribeca loft in the summer of 1995. The couple became engaged later that year.

Kennedy and Bessette married on September 21, 1996, on Cumberland Island, Georgia. The ceremony was held by candlelight at the First African Baptist Church before about 40 guests, and the couple kept the wedding secret from the press until afterward. Narciso Rodriguez, then an unknown designer working at Cerruti, designed Bessette's silk crepe wedding dress. Kennedy's sister, Caroline Kennedy, served as matron of honor, while his cousin Anthony Radziwill was best man. The couple honeymooned in Turkey and Greece.

After the wedding, Bessette-Kennedy largely left the fashion industry and took on a public role beside her husband. She appeared with him at benefits, White House dinners, George magazine events, and gatherings involving the Kennedy family. Friends told People that she missed having her own career and had considered returning to work or studying film, but constant press attention made such plans difficult. Friends later described the marriage as affectionate but strained and cited disagreements over children and press attention.

== Public image and media scrutiny ==
When Kennedy married Bessette, he was already widely known as the son of President John F. Kennedy and Jacqueline Kennedy Onassis and as editor of the political magazine George. Their marriage generated media interest in Bessette's fashion career and Kennedy's political family. Coverage soon focused on Bessette-Kennedy's clothing and public appearances, while her work at Calvin Klein received less attention than her relationship with Kennedy.

Reporters and photographers regularly followed the couple in New York, and gossip columns covered their movements, clothes, social life, and even public disagreements. When the couple returned from their honeymoon in October 1996, Kennedy asked reporters outside their Tribeca apartment to give his wife privacy while she adjusted to public life. Some celebrity publications said they would avoid intrusive reporting, but other outlets kept on publishing photographs, pregnancy speculation, and stories about the couple's daily life. Bessette-Kennedy avoided interviews and tried to dodge paparazzi, while fashion magazines treated her appearance and clothes as objects of close study. Their secret wedding had briefly kept the press away, but that privacy did not last.

Bessette-Kennedy did not seek publicity and gave no interviews while married to Kennedy. With little information from her directly, press coverage relied on biographical fragments, fashion commentary, and speculation about the couple. The Guardian argued in a 1999 article that her reserve was often turned against her, with hostile coverage portraying her as aloof, difficult, and ill-suited to the public role expected of Kennedy's wife. Friends and acquaintances later said she had become more comfortable attending public events in the months before her death.

After the couple's deaths, accounts of their marital difficulties became the subject of dispute. In July 2003, People reported on Edward Klein's book The Kennedy Curse, which alleged that Bessette-Kennedy used cocaine, had been violent toward her husband, and that their marriage was nearing divorce. Several friends of the couple disputed Klein's account. Friends interviewed by People in 2000 had also said the couple had serious arguments but disputed claims that the marriage was ending or that drug use and infidelity had defined it. Later accounts differed on whether the couple had entered marriage counseling before their deaths.

=== Style and fashion ===
Fashion editors and designers quickly singled out Bessette-Kennedy for her style. Anna Wintour praised her "modern style", Liz Tilberis said she could become a symbol of American fashion, and Women's Wear Daily editor Patrick McCarthy predicted that she would become a style icon. Her wedding dress, a bias-cut silk crepe gown by Narciso Rodriguez, quickly drew notice in the fashion press and inspired knock-offs. Bessette-Kennedy was nominated for Best Female Personal Style at the 1997 VH1/Vogue Fashion Awards.

She often wore black, kept her hair pulled back, and favored designers such as Prada and Yohji Yamamoto. Newsweek called her look a mix of high and low fashion, and quoted Michael Kors as saying that she looked elegant without appearing studied. Vogue later identified her with sleek separates, slip dresses, thin-strapped sandals, headbands, red lipstick, and restrained combinations of beige and black. Her wardrobe often featured neutral colours and simple designs. Marie Claire noted in 2024 that her style remained relevant amid interest in timeless, well-made clothing.

== Death ==
On July 16, 1999, Bessette-Kennedy died with her husband and her sister Lauren Bessette when the Piper Saratoga he was piloting crashed into the Atlantic Ocean near Martha's Vineyard, Massachusetts. The flight had left Essex County Airport in New Jersey at 8:38 p.m. and was due at Martha's Vineyard Airport at 10 p.m. The National Transportation Safety Board (NTSB) determined that the probable cause was Kennedy's failure to maintain control of the airplane during a descent over water at night, resulting from spatial disorientation; haze and the dark night were listed as contributing factors. The NTSB also reported that toxicology testing was negative for alcohol and drugs of abuse.

The United States Coast Guard began searching early on July 17 and shifted from search-and-rescue to recovery later that day. Searchers located the fuselage on July 20, and Navy divers recovered the bodies of Kennedy, Bessette-Kennedy, and Lauren Bessette from the ocean floor at a depth of 110 feet on July 21. Autopsies found that all three died on impact. On July 22, relatives from the Kennedy and Bessette families scattered their ashes from the destroyer USS Briscoe off Martha's Vineyard.

== Legacy and portrayals ==
Books and television productions about Bessette-Kennedy appeared after her death. In 2004, former Calvin Klein model Michael Bergin published The Other Man: John F. Kennedy Jr., Carolyn Bessette, and Me, in which he claimed that he and Bessette-Kennedy had a relationship before and during her marriage. In 2005, Carole Radziwill, a close friend of John and Carolyn and the widow of Kennedy's cousin Anthony Radziwill, published What Remains: A Memoir of Fate, Friendship, and Love, which discussed the couple and the 1999 crash. In 2019, footage from Kennedy and Bessette-Kennedy's wedding was shown in the TLC documentary JFK Jr. and Carolyn's Wedding: The Lost Tapes, which included interviews with friends and wedding guests. Elizabeth Beller's biography Once Upon a Time: The Captivating Life of Carolyn Bessette-Kennedy was published in 2024.

In 2015, Gone Girl director David Fincher said that he had asked lead actress Rosamund Pike to study Bessette-Kennedy's public image and self-presentation while preparing to play Amy Dunne. In 2026, Bessette-Kennedy was portrayed by Sarah Pidgeon in Love Story: John F. Kennedy Jr. & Carolyn Bessette, a nine-episode FX limited series inspired by Beller's biography. Pidgeon said that because Bessette-Kennedy had not given interviews, she built the role from books, documentaries, photographs, and accounts from people who had known her.

Fashion designer Wes Gordon said in 2015 that her pared-back sensibility influenced his fall womenswear collection. Marie Claire wrote in 2024 that her 1990s wardrobe had influenced later collections by Burberry, Chanel, and Maryam Nassir Zadeh. In 2023, Sunita Kumar Nair published CBK: Carolyn Bessette Kennedy: A Life in Fashion, a book devoted to Bessette-Kennedy's style. Vogue wrote in 2024 that she had appeared on designers' mood boards for two decades, and that Sotheby's, a major auction house known for selling fine art, jewelry, and collectible fashion, had included three of her coats in a fashion-icons auction.

== See also ==
- Kennedy curse
