= Michael Berman =

Michael Berman may refer to:

- Michael J. Berman, American businessman, founder of George magazine with John F. Kennedy, Jr.
- Michael Berman, California political consultant and brother of Rep. Howard Berman
