= The Housemaid's Secret =

Upcoming film by Paul Feig

- Teaser poster
- Directed by: Paul Feig
- Screenplay by: Rebecca Sonnenshine
- Based on: The Housemaid's Secret by Freida McFadden
- Produced by: Todd Lieberman; Laura Fischer; Paul Feig
- Starring: Sydney Sweeney; Kirsten Dunst; Michele Morrone; Paul Anthony Kelly; Brittany Snow; Stephen Kalyn
- Production companies: Hidden Pictures; Pretty Dangerous Pictures
- Distributed by: Lionsgate
- Release date: December 17, 2027
- Country: United States
- Language: English

The Housemaid's Secret is an upcoming American psychological thriller film directed by Paul Feig and starring Sydney Sweeney, Kirsten Dunst, Michele Morrone, Paul Anthony Kelly, and Brittany Snow. It is a sequel to The Housemaid (2025), and is adapted from the 2023 novel by Freida McFadden.

The Housemaid's Secret is scheduled to be released in the United States on December 17, 2027, by Lionsgate.

== Cast ==
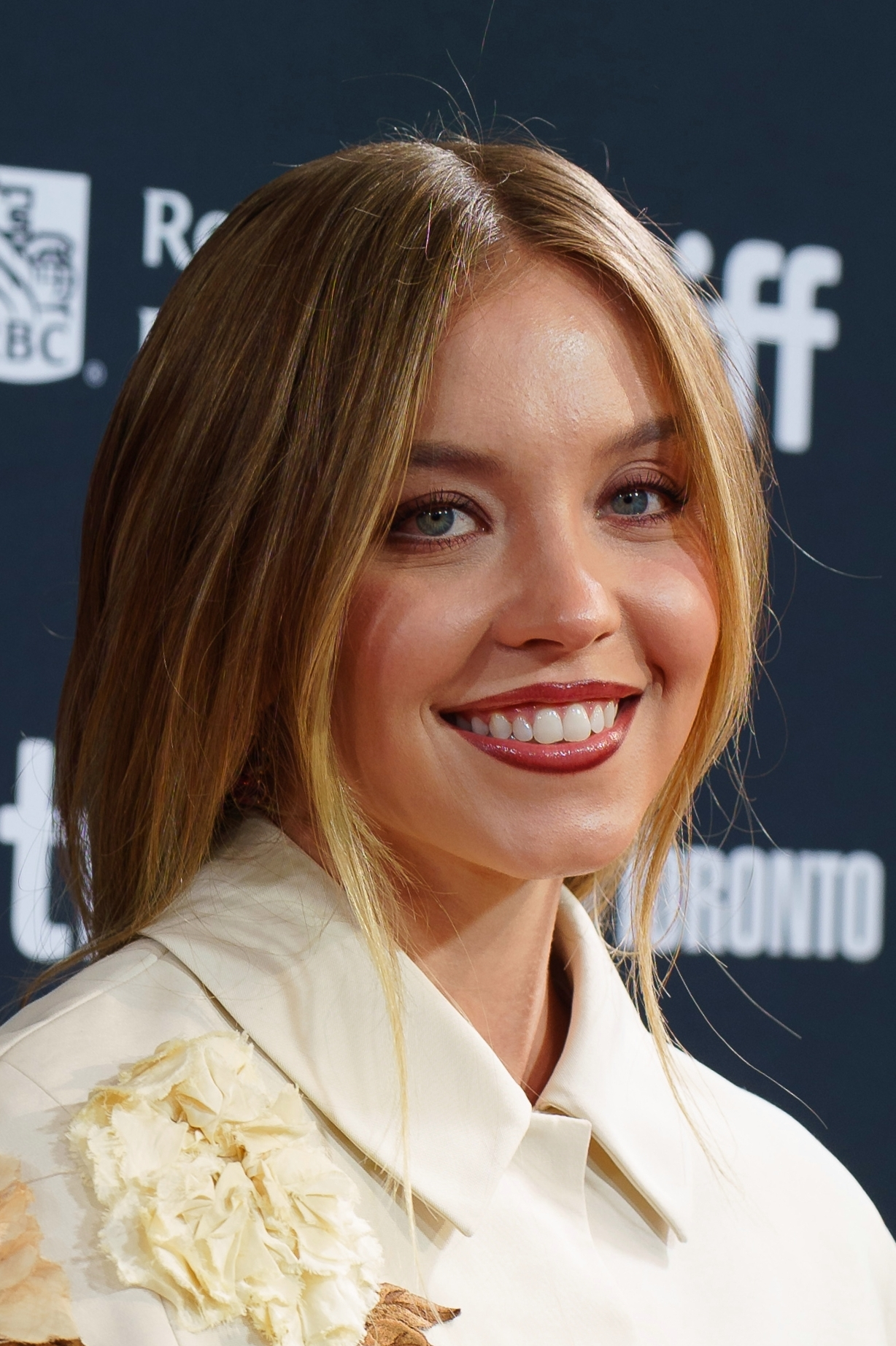
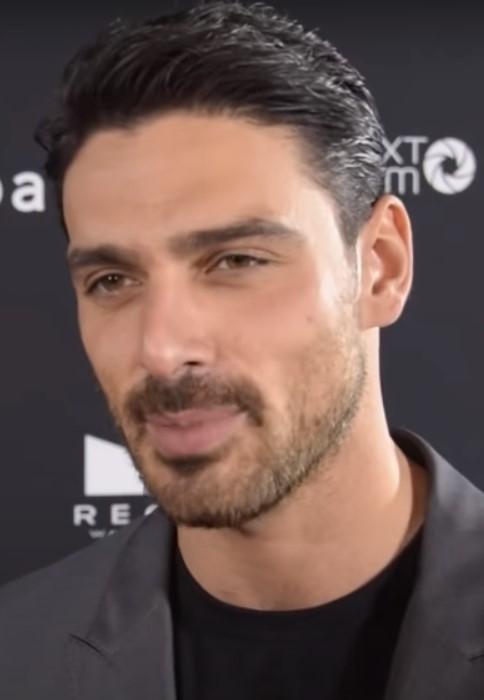
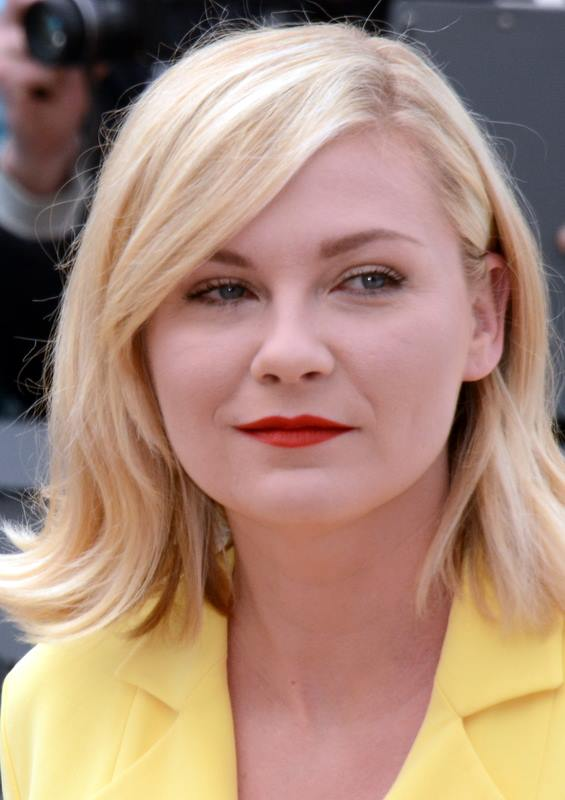
Sydney Sweeney and Michele Morrone reprise their roles from the first film, while Kirsten Dunst joins the cast.
- Sydney Sweeney as Millie Calloway, a housemaid who has a criminal past
- Kirsten Dunst as Wendy Garrick
- Michele Morrone as Enzo
- Paul Anthony Kelly as Douglas Garrick
- Brittany Snow as Marybeth
- Stephen Kalyn as Brock

== Production ==
Lionsgate Films greenlit the sequel in early 2026 with Paul Feig, Sydney Sweeney, and Rebecca Sonnenshine returning following the success of The Housemaid (2025). Feig will produce alongside his partner, Laura Fischer, and Todd Lieberman. Michele Morrone is also expected to return as Enzo. In March 2026, Kirsten Dunst joined the cast, with Morrone confirmed to be returning for the sequel. In June 2026, Paul Anthony Kelly joined the cast. In August, Brittany Snow and Stephen Kalyn joined the cast.

Principal photography had begun by October 2026. First-look images from filming were released to the media that month.

== Release ==
The Housemaid's Secret is scheduled to be released in the United States on December 17, 2027.
