= Anthony Radziwiłł =

Swiss American television producer, filmmaker (1959–1999)

Prince Anthony Radziwiłł
- Born: Anthony Stanisław Albert Radziwiłł; August 4, 1959; Lausanne, Switzerland
- Died: August 10, 1999 (aged 40); Manhattan, New York City, U.S.
- Noble family: Radziwiłł
- Spouse: Carole DiFalco (m. 1994)
- Father: Stanisław Albrecht Radziwiłł
- Mother: Caroline Lee Bouvier Canfield

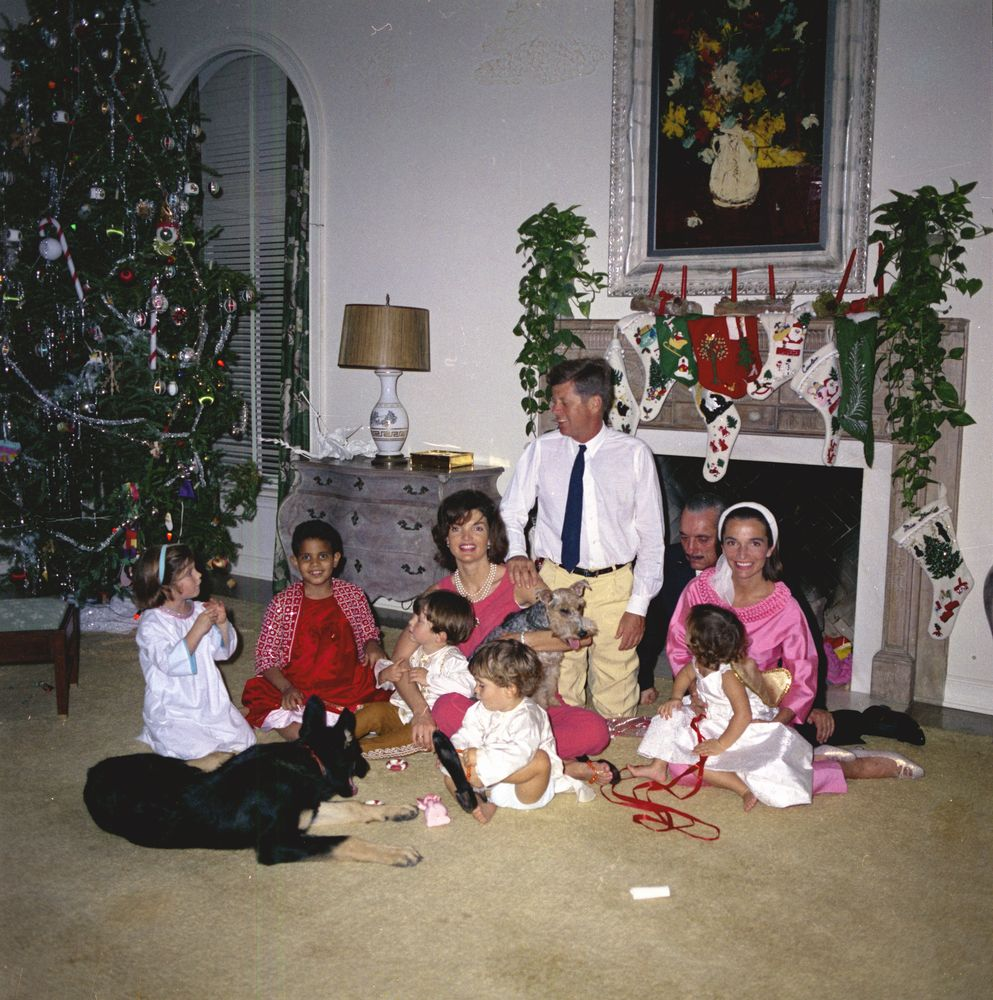
Anthony Radziwill (third child from left) with the late president John F. Kennedy and his family in 1962

Prince Anthony Stanisław Albert Radziwiłł (Polish pronunciation: [raˈd͡ʑiviww]; August 4, 1959 – August 10, 1999) was a Swiss-born American television executive and filmmaker.

He was the son of Caroline Lee Bouvier Canfield and Polish aristocrat and diplomat Prince Stanisław Radziwiłł, and a nephew of former First Lady Jacqueline Kennedy Onassis.

== Early life and education ==
Born in Lausanne, Switzerland, Radziwiłł was the son of Prince Stanisław Albrecht Radziwiłł by his third wife, socialite and actress Caroline Bouvier (younger sister of First Lady Jacqueline Bouvier Kennedy). By birth, he was a member of the House of Radziwill, one of the wealthiest and most important Polish-Lithuanian magnate families. He was also a descendant of King Frederick William I of Prussia via Princess Louise of Prussia, and George I of Great Britain via his only daughter Sophia Dorothea of Hanover. His paternal cousin was Countess Isabella Potocka who married Count Hubert d'Ornano, the owner of Sisley who was a son of Guillaume d'Ornano, a co-founder of Lancôme. His maternal first cousin once removed was Mary Lee Ryan (1931–2017), the wife of William Amherst Vanderbilt Cecil, owner of Biltmore. He married a former ABC colleague, Emmy Award–winning journalist Carole DiFalco, on 27 August 1994 on Long Island, New York.

Radziwiłł attended Millfield School and the Choate School preparatory school in Wallingford, Connecticut. In 1982, he finished his studies at Boston University, earning a bachelor's degree in broadcast journalism. In New York, he was a member of the Knickerbocker Club.

== Career ==
Radziwiłł's career began at NBC Sports, as an associate producer. During the 1988 Winter Olympics in Calgary, Alberta, Canada, he contributed Emmy Award-winning work. In 1989, he joined ABC News as a television producer for Primetime Live. In 1990, he won the Peabody Award for an investigation on the resurgence of Nazism in the United States. Posthumously, in 2000, Cancer: Evolution to Revolution was awarded a Peabody. His work was nominated for two Emmy's: Outstanding non-fiction special for Lenny Bruce: Swear To Tell The Truth in 1999 and Outstanding achievement in non-fiction programming for Cancer: Evolution to Revolution in 2000

== Illness ==
Around 1989 he was diagnosed with testicular cancer and underwent treatment which left him sterile but in apparent remission. However, shortly before his wedding, new tumors emerged. Radziwiłł battled metastasizing cancer throughout his five years of marriage, with his wife, Carole, serving as his primary caretaker through a succession of oncologists, hospitals, operations, and experimental treatments.

The couple lived in New York, and both Radziwiłł and Carole tried to maintain their careers as journalists between his bouts of hospitalization.

On September 21, 1996, Radziwiłł was the best man for the wedding of his best friend and cousin John F. Kennedy Jr. and Carolyn Bessette. Kennedy's older sister, Caroline, was the matron of honor.

== Death ==
Radziwiłł died of cancer on August 10, 1999, aged 40, less than a month after his cousin John Jr., his wife Carolyn Bessette, and her sister Lauren Bessette predeceased him in a plane crash. His body was cremated, ashes taken to Nesvizh and interred in the Radziwiłłs' family crypt in the Corpus Christi Church.

In 2000, his mother and widow set up a fund in his name to help emerging documentary filmmakers.

== In popular culture ==
Radziwill is portrayed by Erich Bergen in Ryan Murphy's 2026 series Love Story.

== Ancestry ==
Ancestors of Anthony Radziwiłł

8. Prince Ferdynand Radziwiłł
4. Prince Janusz Franciszek Radziwiłł
9. Princess Pelagia Sapieha
2. Prince Stanisław Albrecht Radziwiłł
10. Prince Stanisław Michał Lubomirski
5. Princess Anna Lubomirska
11. Princess Wanda Maria Lubomirska
1. Prince Anthony Radziwiłł
12. John Vernou Bouvier Jr.
6. John Vernou Bouvier III
13. Maude Frances Sergeant
3. Caroline Lee Bouvier
14. James Thomas Lee Jr.
7. Janet Norton Lee
15. Margaret Ann Merritt

== Bibliography ==
- Radziwiłł, Carole (2005). What Remains: A Memoir of Fate, Friendship and Love. Scribner. ISBN 978-0-7432-7718-1.
