= Essex County Airport =

Airport in Fairfield, New Jersey US

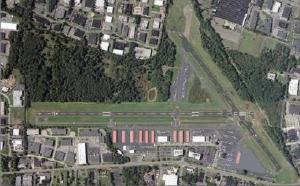
- IATA: CDW; ICAO: KCDW; FAA LID: CDW

Summary
- Airport type: Public
- Owner: Essex County Improvement Authority
- Serves: Caldwell, New Jersey
- Elevation AMSL: 172 ft (52 m)
- Coordinates: 40°52′31″N 074°16′53″W
- Website: www.FlyCDW.com

Maps
- FAA airport diagram
- Interactive map of Essex County Airport

Runways
Direction	Length		Surface
Direction	ft	m	Surface
4/22	4,552	1,387	Asphalt
10/28	3,719	1,134	Asphalt

Statistics (2022)
- Aircraft operations (year ending 9/30/2022): 90,504
- Based aircraft: 197
- Source: Federal Aviation Administration

Essex County Airport (IATA: CDW, ICAO: KCDW, FAA LID: CDW), informally known as Caldwell Airport, is a public use airport located in Fairfield Township, Essex County, New Jersey, 2 nautical miles (3.7 km) north of the central business district of Caldwell, a borough of northwestern Essex County in the U.S. state of New Jersey. It is owned by the Essex County Improvement Authority. This facility is included in the National Plan of Integrated Airport Systems for 2011–2015, which categorized it as a general aviation reliever airport.

== History ==
In April 1929 Essex Airport Corporation was formed by Walter Marvin and six other individuals. The intention of the company was to open an airport to serve Montclair, New Jersey, a town seven miles (11 km) away. Some of the early references to the airport have the designation "Marvin Airport", named after Walter Marvin.

In 1999, the airport gained national attention when John F. Kennedy Jr., who based his private aircraft there, crashed hours after departing the airport en route for Martha's Vineyard.

== Facilities and aircraft ==
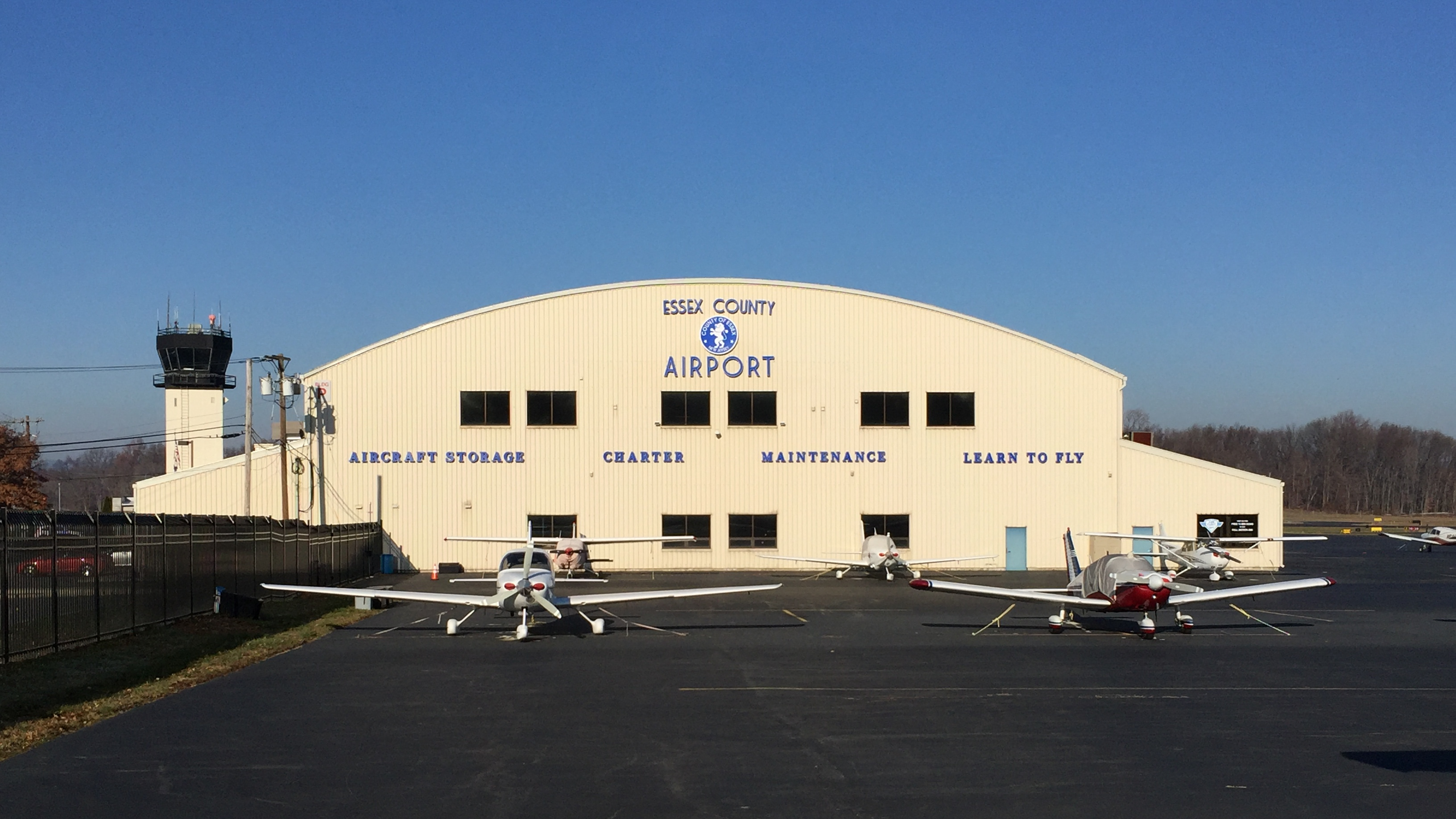
Essex County Airport main building and tower

Essex County Airport covers an area of 275 acres (111 ha) at an elevation of 172 feet (52 m) above mean sea level. It has two runways with asphalt surfaces: 4/22 is 4,552 by 80 feet (1,387 by 24 m) and 10/28 is 3,719 by 75 feet (1,134 by 23 m).

For the 12-month period ending September 30, 2022, the airport had 90,504 aircraft operations, an average of 248 per day: 96% general aviation, 2% air taxi, 1% military, and <1% commercial. Around that time there were 197 aircraft based at this airport: 161 single-engine, 19 multi-engine, 7 jets and 10 helicopters.

The weather station reports are commonly identified as "Caldwell".

== Airlines and destinations ==
Airlines	Destinations
Tropic Ocean Airways	Seasonal: New York Seaplane Base

== Accidents and incidents ==
- On August 29, 1982, a Cessna 172 carrying a flight instructor and student pilot collided with a Cessna 150 flown by a student pilot. The control tower did not have a radar system installed at the time and had instructed the Cessna 172 to fly an overhead entry to the traffic pattern while the Cessna 150 was on its downwind leg. The resulting collision sheared a wing off of the Cessna 172 and the ensuing crash resulted in the death of both occupants. The pilot of the other aircraft made a forced landing at the airport and skidded off the runway with the plane coming to rest on its nose.
- On November 15, 2002, a Mooney M10 and a Piper PA-32R-300 collided in the traffic pattern while maneuvering at night for an approach to runway 22. The pilots of both planes were killed in the crash that followed.
- On January 15, 2007, a Beechcraft A36 Bonanza in night IMC conditions impacted trees on a ridgeline while on approach to the airport. At the start of its approach, the aircraft was 200 feet below the published minimum descent altitude for the instrument approach procedure and over the next 1.5 miles descended at a 7-degree angle and a 945-feet-per-minute rate of descent, resulting in controlled flight into terrain. Upon hitting trees, the plane flipped over, landed in a street and burst into flames, killing the pilot.
- On July 5, 2010, a Cirrus SR-22 crashed on its approach for landing about 100 yards North of the airport. All three passengers on board were killed in the crash and ensuing fire.
- On August 15, 2015, shortly after takeoff from runway 22, the pilot of a Cessna 205 reported that he was unable to maintain power and attempted a turn back towards the airport. The airplane descended, impacted wooded terrain and was partially consumed by the post-impact fire, killing the pilot.
- On February 17, 2022, a Cessna Citation CJ3 crashed off the end of Runway 22 into a drainage brook. No injuries among the 3 occupants were reported.

== See also ==
- List of airports in New Jersey
- List of airports in the New York City area
- Transportation in New York City
