= Gary Ginsberg =

American lawyer

- Born: August 30, 1962 (age 63); Buffalo, NY
- Education: Brown University (BA); Columbia University (JD)
- Occupations: Senior Vice President and Global Head of Communications at SoftBank Group Corp.
- Children: 2

Gary L. Ginsberg (born August 30, 1962) is an American lawyer, political operative and corporate adviser, serving as a strategist in both the public and private sectors for more than 25 years. He was most recently Senior Vice President and Global Head of Communications at SoftBank Group Corp. before resigning in 2020. Before joining SoftBank, Ginsberg served as Executive Vice President of Corporate Marketing and Communications at Time Warner and as Executive Vice President of Global Marketing and Corporate Affairs at News Corp.

== Biography ==
Ginsberg began his legal career as an attorney at Simpson Thacher & Bartlett. After that he served in the Clinton Administration at the White House’s Counsel office and the U.S. Department of Justice. In 1995, Ginsberg became Senior Editor and legal counsel of George, the magazine started by John F. Kennedy Jr.

Ginsberg spent eleven years at News Corporation, serving in several senior roles, including most recently as Executive Vice President of Global Marketing and Corporate Affairs. During this tenure, Ginsberg was a close confidant of Rupert Murdoch and Peter Chernin. In 2009, Ginsberg stepped down from his role at News Corp. following the departure of Chernin, who for years served as Murdoch’s top lieutenant. Ginsberg had been close to Chernin and was also closely associated with Democratic politics. Ginsberg was credited with brokering numerous relationships between Murdoch and prominent Democratic politicians. He arranged lunches with Bill Clinton and orchestrated a fundraiser for Hillary Clinton in 2006. Ginsberg also arranged a meeting between Murdoch and Barack Obama in 2008. Ginsberg was described as the “Murdoch Interpreter - the point man for all of the information going out of the company, as well as the information going into the company.” He was also "a point man for News Corp.’s 2007 purchase of Dow Jones, publisher of The Wall Street Journal."

Ginsberg joined Time Warner in February 2010. His new job was described "as a senior adviser to its CEO Jeff Bewkes..., executive vice president, ... [and] responsible for a range of corporate issues, including communications and marketing, and for evangelism across the media industry for Mr. Bewkes’s initiatives.” Ginsberg again served as “the connection to Washington on multiple instances.” The Wall Street Journal reported in early 2017 that Ginsberg met with Jared Kushner at the White House. At the meeting Kushner “expressed the administration's deep concerns about CNN’s according to an administration official.

Ginsberg held a breakfast meeting in 2016 with his former colleague Peter Chernin in Martha’s Vineyard where Chernin first broached the possibility of AT&T acquiring Time Warner. Ginsberg was “in the middle of the fight to defend the company’s sale to AT&T.” Two years later the deal was completed and Ginsberg left the company along with other senior colleagues from Time Warner.

In October 2018 Ginsberg was hired by Softbank as the company's Global Chief of Communications. While at Sofbank, Ginsberg worked on a number of initiatives including the launch a new global website and more sophisticated video content to sharpen the company messaging. Ginsberg is the author of First Friends: The Powerful, Unsung (and Unelected) People Who Shaped our Presidents published in July 2021, which reached The New York Times Best Seller list.

== Personal life ==
Ginsberg is chairman of the Board of New Visions for Public Schools; Director of The City, an online news service covering NYC, and Malaria No More; and serves as a member of the Advisory Board of the Genesis Prize Foundation Genesis Prize Foundation. Ginsberg is also an adjunct professor at the Columbia Business School and a member of the Council on Foreign Relations.

Ginsberg holds an undergraduate degree from Brown University, where he was elected to Phi Beta Kappa, and a J.D. from Columbia University School of Law, where was a Harlan Fiske Stone Scholar.
