= Paul Anthony Kelly =

Canadian model and actor (born 1988)

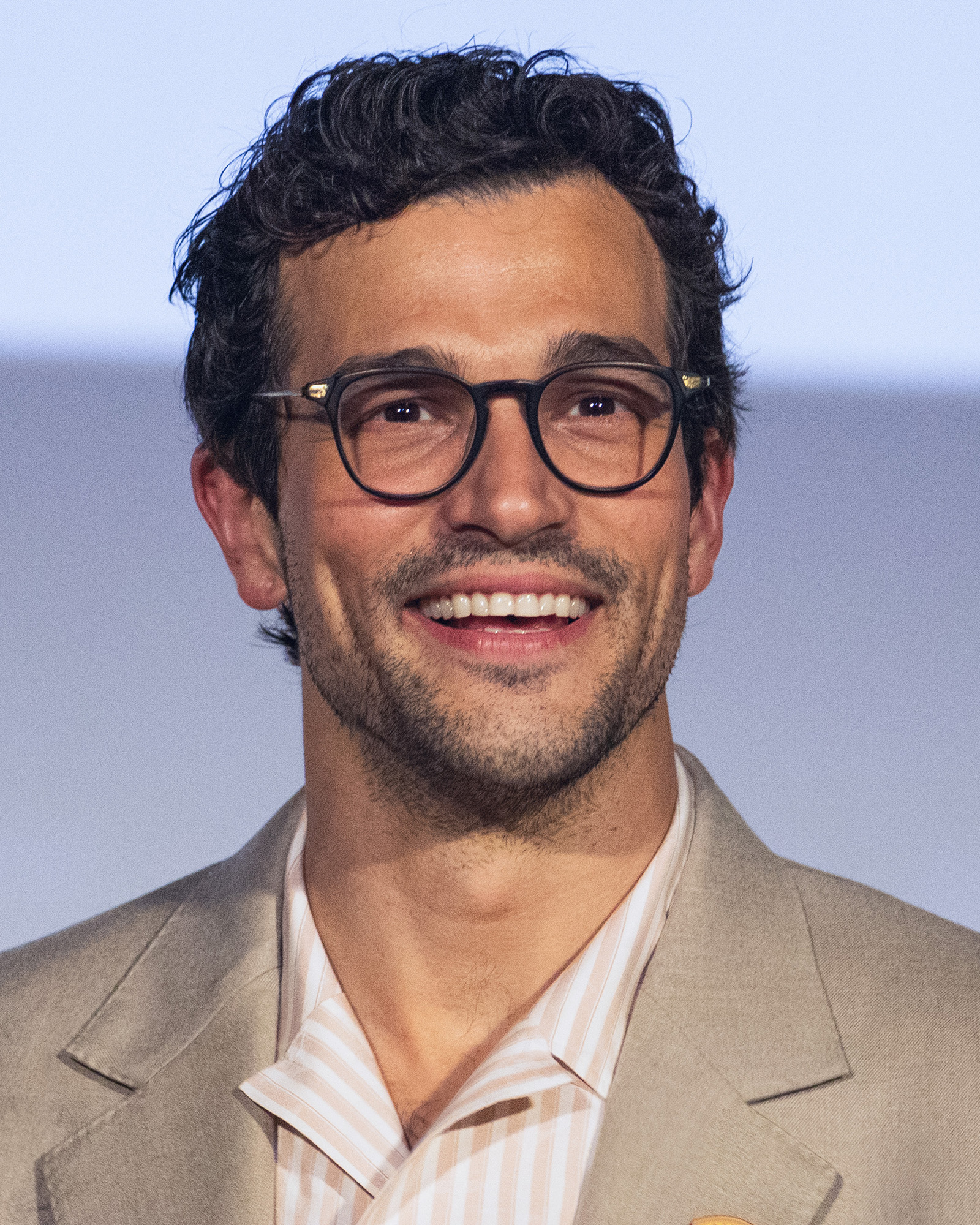
- Kelly in 2026
- Born: Paul Anthony Kelly; October 1, 1988 (age 38); Port McNicoll, Ontario, Canada
- Occupations: Model; actor
- Years active: c. 2013–present
- Spouse: Syd Widziszewski (m. 2023)
- Children: 1

Paul Anthony Kelly (born October 1, 1988) is a Canadian model and actor based in the United States. He is best known for portraying John F. Kennedy Jr. in the first season of the FX anthology miniseries Love Story: John F. Kennedy Jr. & Carolyn Bessette.

== Early life and career ==
Paul Anthony Kelly was born on October 1, 1988, in the small Canadian town of Port McNicoll, Ontario. He is the eldest of four children. He later moved to Toronto and, while working at American Apparel, was discovered by two talent scouts and began modelling after signing a contract with Ford Models. From there, he moved to New York City, where he began auditioning for acting roles while still working as a model, signing with the agency Innovative Artists. He did not find work in acting for a decade, except for a project called The Venery of Samantha Bird, which was ultimately never released in part due to the 2023 SAG-AFTRA strike. As a model, he worked for brands including Rhone Apparel, Vivienne Westwood, Bonobos, John Varvatos, Loro Piana, Perry Ellis, and Brooks Brothers.

Despite having no professional acting experience, he was cast as John F. Kennedy Jr. in Love Story shortly before filming was scheduled to commence. He was cast after a successful chemistry read and screen test with Sarah Pidgeon.

In June 2026, it was announced that Kelly would star in The Housemaid's Secret, alongside Sydney Sweeney and Kirsten Dunst.

== Personal life ==
Kelly married Syd Widziszewski in May 2023, and their first child, a daughter, was born in early 2026. They live in Portland, Oregon, having previously lived in California.

== Filmography ==
=== Film ===
Year	Title	Role	Notes	Ref.
2027	The Housemaid's Secret †	Douglas Garrick	Pre-production	

=== Television ===
Year	Title	Role	Notes	Ref.
2026	Love Story	John F. Kennedy Jr.	Lead role; 9 episodes	
2026	American Horror Story: 13	Young Nas	Recurring role; 4 episodes	

== Awards and nominations ==
Year	Award	Category	Work	Result	Ref.
2026	Newport Beach TV Fest	Breakout Award	Love Story	Won	
