= Lauren Bessette =

American businesswoman and banker (1964–1999)

- Born: Lauren Gail Bessette; November 5, 1964; White Plains, New York, U.S.
- Died: July 16, 1999 (aged 34); Atlantic Ocean, off the coast of Martha's Vineyard
- Education: William Smith College (BA); Wharton School (MBA)
- Occupations: Investment banker Financial Analyst
- Relatives: Carolyn Bessette (sister); John F. Kennedy Jr. (brother-in-law)

Lauren Gail Bessette (November 5, 1964 – July 16, 1999) was an American businesswoman and investment banker who, at the height of her career, was a vice president of investment banking at Morgan Stanley when she died at age 34 in an aircraft accident. She became a public figure through her brother-in-law, John F. Kennedy Jr.

== Life and career ==
Bessette was born in White Plains, New York, to Ann (née Messina) and William J. Bessette. Her parents divorced when she was at a young age and she was raised by her mother and stepfather, Richard Freeman. She had a twin sister, Lisa, and a younger sister, Carolyn. She grew up in Greenwich, Connecticut, and graduated from Greenwich High School in 1982. She then attended William Smith College in New York, majoring in economics. She joined the treasury staff of the Morgan Stanley Group in 1986 after graduation. Later, she received her Master of Business Administration degree from the Wharton School of the University of Pennsylvania.

After graduating from Wharton, she returned to work at the Morgan Stanley Dean Witter offices in Manhattan, specializing in Asian financial markets. Bessette was fluent in Mandarin Chinese. She rose through the corporate ranks of Morgan Stanley, and served as vice president of investment banking, living in Hong Kong from 1994 until 1998, when she returned to the United States and transferred to the New York City Morgan Stanley corporate offices to be near her sister, Carolyn.

== Personal life ==
Bessette was survived by her fraternal twin Lisa, her parents and stepfather. It was reported in the media at the time of her death that she was dating Bobby Shriver.

== Death and aftermath ==
On July 16, 1999, Bessette was killed when the Piper Saratoga II HP she was in crashed into the Atlantic Ocean off the coast of Martha's Vineyard. The National Transportation Safety Board (NTSB) determined that the probable cause of the crash was "[John F. Kennedy Jr.]'s failure to maintain control of the airplane during a descent over water at night, which was a result of spatial disorientation."

In a eulogy for The Independent, journalist Fergal Keane described Bessette as "less of a human being" and "more like a force of nature". Keane had met Bessette while on assignment in China, and wrote that "Lauren certainly didn't look like a bodyguard - more a catwalk model ... Her physical appearance was striking. Tall and statuesque, with long brown hair".

She received a formal military funeral administered by the U.S. Navy, after which her ashes were scattered from U.S naval ship USS Briscoe off the coast of Martha's Vineyard. Over 500 mourners gathered at Christ Church in Greenwich to remember Bessette, including several members of the Kennedy family. Ann Messina Freeman gained control of her estate, and a wrongful death lawsuit against the Kennedy family was settled out of court.

== Media portrayal ==
Bessette was portrayed by Sydney Lemmon in the 2026 TV miniseries Love Story.

== See also ==
- Kennedy curse
