= Michael J. Berman =

Co-Founder of George Magazine

- Occupations: Businessman, Public Relations Executive
- Organization(s): George magazine (Co-founder, President until 1998); Novix Media (Chairman); Hachette Productions (President and COO), Galaxy Ventures (President)
- Known for: Co-founding George magazine with John F. Kennedy Jr. in 1995.

Michael J. Berman is an American businessman, responsible for founding George magazine with John F. Kennedy Jr. in 1995. Due to Kennedy's fame, it was the largest magazine launch that year. At the time of the launch, Berman owned a New York public relations firm.

The two had apparently been quietly working on the project for several years before selling an interest to global publisher Hachette Filipacchi Media, which was responsible for its launch. Berman sold his share of the company in 1997 and continued to serve as George's president until 1998.

Berman has subsequently headed several media-related and investment companies, including holding the post of chairman at Novix Media and president and Chief Operating Officer of Hachette Productions, a Hachette Filipacchi subsidiary that focuses on film and television media. As of 2003, he was serving as president of Galaxy Ventures.

== In popular culture ==
Berman is portrayed by Michael Nathanson in the 2026 television mini-series Love Story.
