= John F. Kennedy Jr. =

American attorney and magazine publisher (1960–1999)

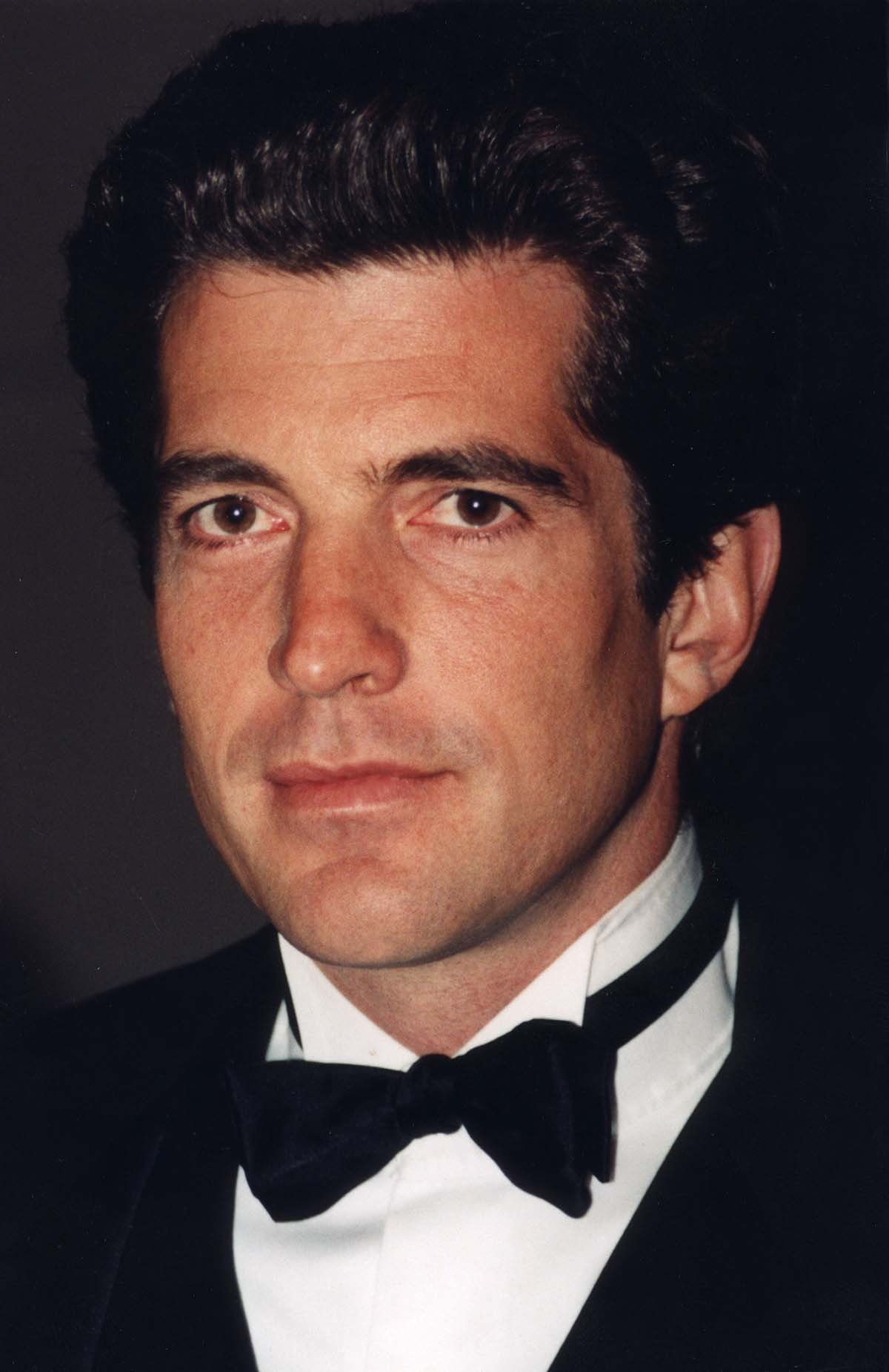
- Kennedy in 1997
- Born: John Fitzgerald Kennedy Jr. November 25, 1960; Washington, D.C., U.S.
- Died: July 16, 1999 (aged 38); Atlantic Ocean, near Martha's Vineyard, Massachusetts, U.S.
- Cause of death: Plane crash
- Other name: JFK Jr.
- Education: Brown University (BA); New York University (JD)
- Occupations: Businessman; attorney; journalist; magazine publisher
- Political party: Democratic
- Spouse: Carolyn Bessette (m. 1996)
- Parents: John F. Kennedy; Jacqueline Kennedy Onassis
- Family: Kennedy family Bouvier family

John Fitzgerald Kennedy Jr. (November 25, 1960 – July 16, 1999), also referred to as JFK Jr., was an American businessman, attorney, magazine publisher, and journalist. He was the son of the 35th U.S. president John F. Kennedy, and First Lady Jacqueline Kennedy.

Born shortly after his father's election, Kennedy spent his early childhood in the White House until the president's assassination, after which he became widely recognized for saluting his father's casket during the funeral procession. He later worked as an assistant district attorney in Manhattan before launching the political lifestyle magazine George in 1995.

A prominent social figure in Manhattan, Kennedy was the subject of sustained media attention throughout his life, including coverage of his marriage to Carolyn Bessette. He was also active in nonprofit work and in supporting his family's political campaigns. Kennedy died in a plane crash in 1999.

== Early life and education ==
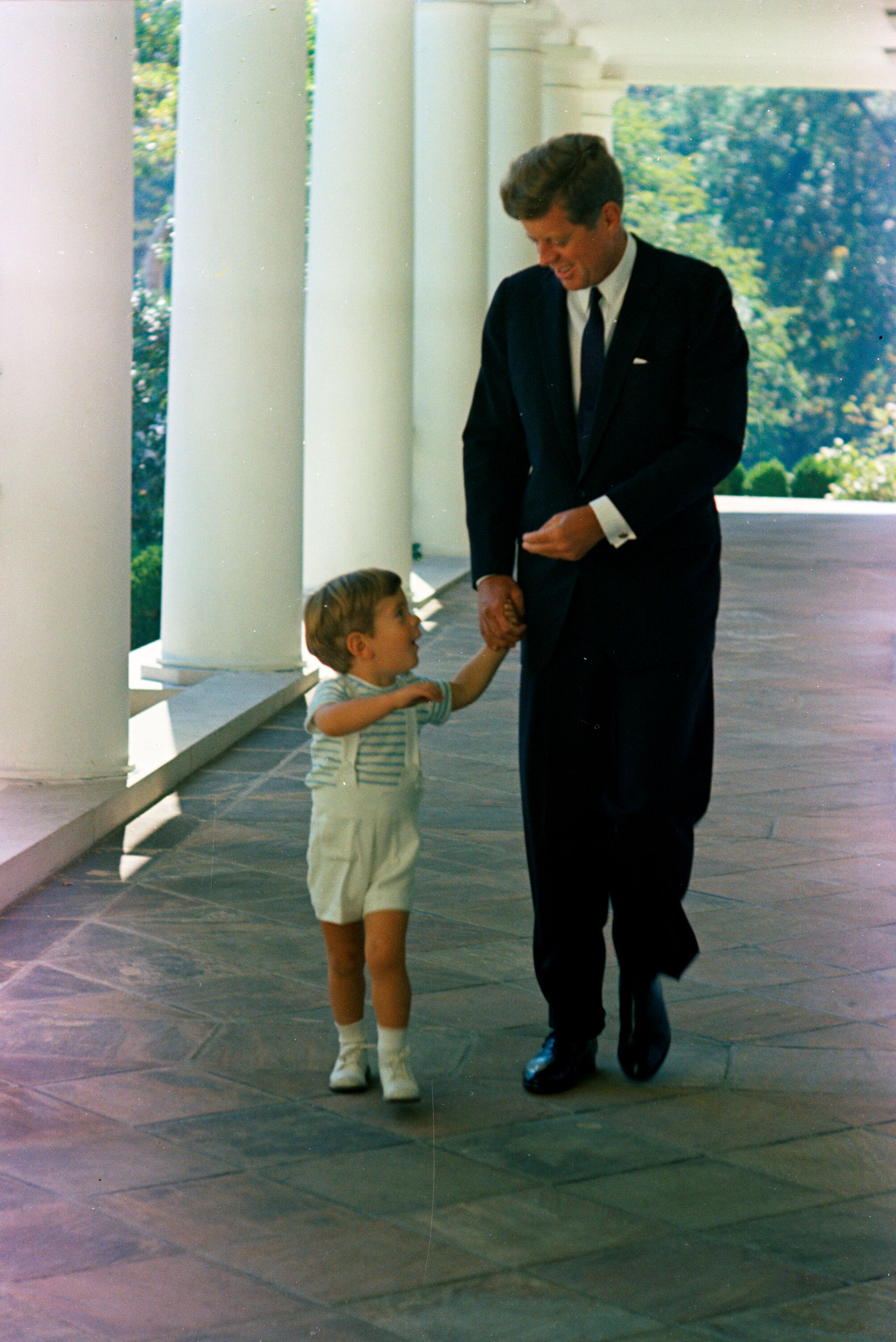
Kennedy at age two with his father in the White House

John Fitzgerald Kennedy Jr. was born on November 25, 1960, in Washington, D.C., to Massachusetts senator John F. Kennedy and Jacqueline Kennedy (née Bouvier). His father had been elected president less than three weeks earlier and was inaugurated two months after his son's birth. Kennedy had an older sister, Caroline, born in 1957. His parents had previously lost a stillborn daughter, Arabella, in 1956, and an infant son, Patrick, who died two days after his premature birth in 1963. His widely repeated nickname, "John-John", originated when a reporter misheard his father calling him "John" twice in quick succession; the family did not use the nickname.

Kennedy on his third birthday at his father's state funeral saluting the coffin

Kennedy lived in the White House during the first three years of his life and remained in the public spotlight. His father was assassinated on November 22, 1963, and the state funeral was held three days later, on Kennedy's third birthday. In a widely broadcast moment, he stepped forward and saluted his father's flag‑draped casket as it was carried out of St. Matthew's Cathedral. NBC News vice president Julian Goodman described the image as "the most impressive... shot in the history of television." The moment was photographed by several journalists, including United Press International photographer Stan Stearns—later chief White House photographer during the Lyndon B. Johnson administration—and Dan Farrell of the New York Daily News. President Johnson wrote his first letter in office to Kennedy, telling him that he "can always be proud" of his father.

Following the assassination, the family continued with their plans for Kennedy's birthday celebration to demonstrate their resolve to carry on despite the president's death. They lived briefly in the Georgetown neighborhood of Washington, D.C., before moving to a luxury apartment on the Upper East Side of Manhattan, where Kennedy grew up. In 1967, his mother took him and Caroline on a six-week "sentimental journey" to Ireland, where they met President Éamon de Valera and visited the Kennedy ancestral home in Dunganstown.

After the assassination of Kennedy's uncle Robert in 1968, Jacqueline took Caroline and Kennedy out of the United States, saying, "If they're killing Kennedys, then my children are targets ... I want to get out of this country." She married Greek shipping magnate Aristotle Onassis later that year, and the family moved to his private island of Skorpios. Kennedy reportedly considered his stepfather "a joke". Onassis died in 1975 and left his widow an annual income of $250,000, though she later settled with Christina Onassis for $25 million in exchange for not contesting the will.

Kennedy returned to the White House with his mother and sister in 1971 for the first time since his father's assassination. President Richard Nixon's daughters gave him a tour that included his former bedroom, and Nixon showed him the Resolute desk under which his father had allowed him to play.

Kennedy attended private schools in Manhattan, beginning at Saint David's School and later moving to Collegiate School, which he attended from third to 10th grade. He completed his secondary education at Phillips Academy in Andover, Massachusetts. After graduating, he accompanied his mother on a trip to Africa. During a pioneering course, Kennedy's group became lost for two days without food or water; he led them to safety, earning credit for leadership.

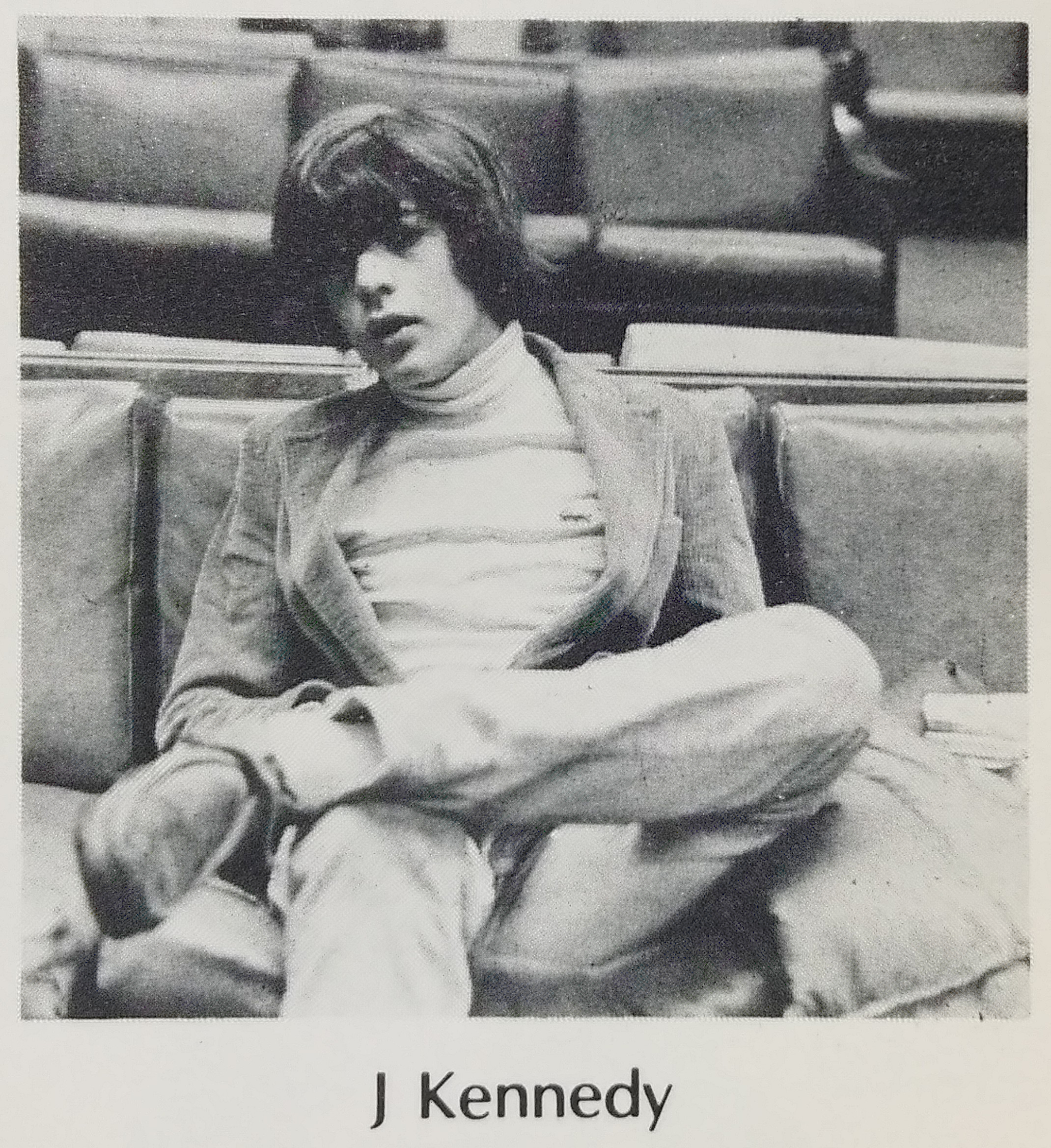
Kennedy's ninth grade Collegiate School yearbook photo, 1975

In 1976, Kennedy and his cousin travelled to the earthquake-affected region of Rabinal in Guatemala, where they assisted with heavy construction work and distributed food. A local priest said that they "ate what the people of Rabinal ate and dressed in Guatemalan clothes and slept in tents like most of the earthquake victims," adding that the two "did more for their country's image" in Guatemala "than a roomful of ambassadors." On his 16th birthday, Kennedy's Secret Service protection ended, and he spent the summer of 1978 working as a wrangler in Wyoming. In 1979, the John F. Kennedy Presidential Library and Museum in Boston was dedicated, and Kennedy made his first major speech, reciting Stephen Spender's poem "The Truly Great".

Kennedy attended Brown University, where he majored in American studies. He co-founded a student discussion group that focused on contemporary issues such as apartheid in South Africa, gun control, and civil rights. He was appalled by apartheid when visiting South Africa on a summer break and arranged for U.N. ambassador Andrew Young to speak about the topic at Brown. By his junior year, Kennedy had moved off campus to live with several other students in a shared house, and he spent time at Xenon, a club owned by Howard Stein. Kennedy was initiated into Phi Psi, a local social fraternity that had been the Rhode Island Alpha chapter of national Phi Kappa Psi fraternity until 1978.

In January 1983, Kennedy's Massachusetts driver's license was suspended after he received more than three speeding summonses in 12 months and failed to appear at a hearing. The family's lawyer explained that Kennedy most likely "became immersed in exams and just forgot the date of the hearing". That same year, he graduated with a bachelor's degree in American studies and took a break, traveling to India and spending time at the University of Delhi, where he did post-graduate work and met Mother Teresa.

== Career ==
After the 1984 Democratic National Convention in San Francisco, Kennedy returned to New York to earn $20,000 a year at the Office of Business Development, where his boss said that he worked "in the same crummy cubbyhole as everybody else. I heaped on the work and was always pleased." Kennedy continued there as deputy director of the 42nd Street Development Corporation in 1986, conducting negotiations with developers and city agencies.

In 1988, Kennedy became a summer associate at Manatt, Phelps, Rothenberg & Phillips, a Los Angeles law firm with strong ties to the Democratic Party, working for his uncle Ted Kennedy's law school roommate and former Democratic National Committee chairman Charles Manatt. Later that year, People magazine named Kennedy its "Sexiest Man Alive".

From 1989, Kennedy headed Reaching Up, a nonprofit group that provided educational and professional opportunities for workers assisting people with disabilities. William Ebenstein, the group's executive director, said, "He was always concerned with the working poor, and his family always had an interest in helping them."

Kennedy earned a Juris Doctor degree from the New York University School of Law in 1989. He failed the New York bar exam twice before passing on his third attempt in July 1990. After his second failure, he said he would continue taking the exam until he eventually passed. Had he failed a third time, Kennedy would have been ineligible to serve as an assistant district attorney in the Manhattan DA's Office, where he worked for the next four years, handling cases involving consumer fraud and landlord–tenant disputes. On August 29, 1991, he won his first case as a prosecutor.

In the summer of 1992, Kennedy worked as a journalist and was commissioned by The New York Times to write about his kayaking expedition to the Åland Archipelago, during which he rescued a friend after a capsizing incident. He then considered launching a magazine with his friend, public‑relations executive Michael J. Berman, a plan his mother viewed as too risky. According to Christopher Andersen's 2000 book The Day John Died, Jacqueline feared her son would die in a plane crash and asked her longtime companion Maurice Tempelsman "to do whatever it took to keep John from becoming a pilot".

=== Acting ===
Kennedy appeared in numerous plays while at Brown University and continued acting afterward. Although he expressed interest in pursuing acting professionally, his mother strongly disapproved, believing it an unsuitable career. He made his New York acting debut on August 4, 1985, in an invitation‑only performance at the Irish Theater on Manhattan's West Side. Nye Heron, executive director of the Irish Arts Center, said Kennedy was "one of the best young actors I've seen in years". Kennedy's director, Robin Saex, remarked, "He has an earnestness that just shines through." Kennedy's largest acting role was a cameo as a fictionalized version of himself in the eighth‑season Murphy Brown episode "Altered States", in which he visits the title character's office to promote a magazine he is publishing.

=== George magazine ===
In 1995, Kennedy and Berman founded George, a glossy monthly that blended politics, lifestyle, and fashion, with Kennedy holding a 50 percent stake. Kennedy officially launched the magazine at a Manhattan news conference on September 8, joking that he had not seen so many reporters gathered since he failed his first bar exam.

Each issue included an editor's column and interviews written by Kennedy, who believed the magazine could make politics "accessible by covering it in an entertaining and compelling way", encouraging broader public engagement. He conducted interviews with figures such as Louis Farrakhan, Billy Graham, and Garth Brooks.

The debut issue drew criticism for its cover image of Cindy Crawford dressed as George Washington in a powdered wig and ruffled shirt. Kennedy defended the choice, saying that "political magazines should look like Mirabella."

In July 1997, Vanity Fair published a profile of New York City mayor Rudy Giuliani, alleging he was having an affair with his press secretary, a claim both denied. Kennedy considered pursuing the story but ultimately declined. That same month, he wrote about meeting Mother Teresa, stating that the "three days I spent in her presence was the strongest evidence this struggling Catholic has ever had that God exists."

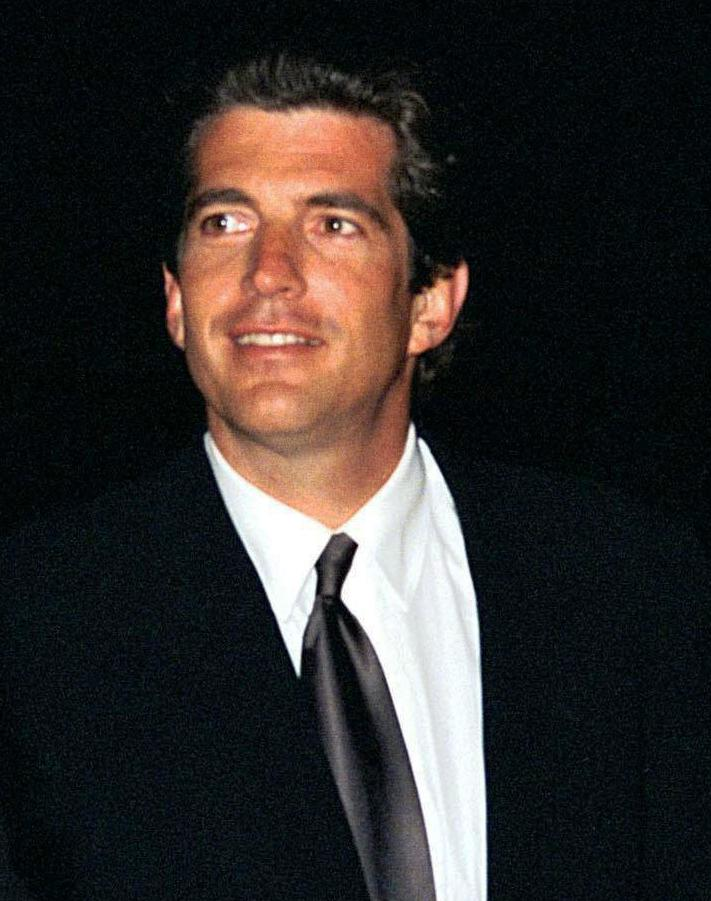
Kennedy in 1998

The September 1997 issue focused on the theme of temptation and featured Kennedy's cousins Michael LeMoyne Kennedy and Joseph P. Kennedy II. Michael, a Boston attorney, had been accused of an affair with his children's underage babysitter, while Joseph, a Massachusetts congressman, had been accused by his ex-wife of bullying her. John wrote that both cousins had become "poster boys for bad behavior", and argued that media coverage of them was unfair because of their surname. Joseph quipped, paraphrasing John's father, "Ask not what you can do for your cousin, but what you can do for his magazine."

==== Decline ====
By early 1997, Kennedy and Berman were embroiled in a power struggle marked by shouting matches, slammed doors, and even a physical confrontation. Berman sold his share of the company, and Kennedy assumed his responsibilities. Sales, already declining, fell sharply after Berman's departure.

Hachette Filipacchi Magazines, a partner in George, attributed the decline partly to Kennedy's editorial conservatism. CEO David Pecker said Kennedy refused to "take risks as an editor, despite the fact that he was an extraordinary risk taker in other areas of his life." Pecker added that although Kennedy understood the magazine's target audience was readers aged 18 to 34, he often declined interviews that would appeal to them, such as Princess Diana or John Gotti Jr., in favor of figures like Dan Rostenkowski or Võ Nguyên Giáp."

Shortly before his death, Kennedy had been planning a series of online chats with the 2000 presidential candidates, with Microsoft providing the technology and funding in exchange for advertising in George. After Kennedy's death, Hachette bought out the magazine, but it ceased publication in early 2001.

== Later life ==
=== Family activity ===
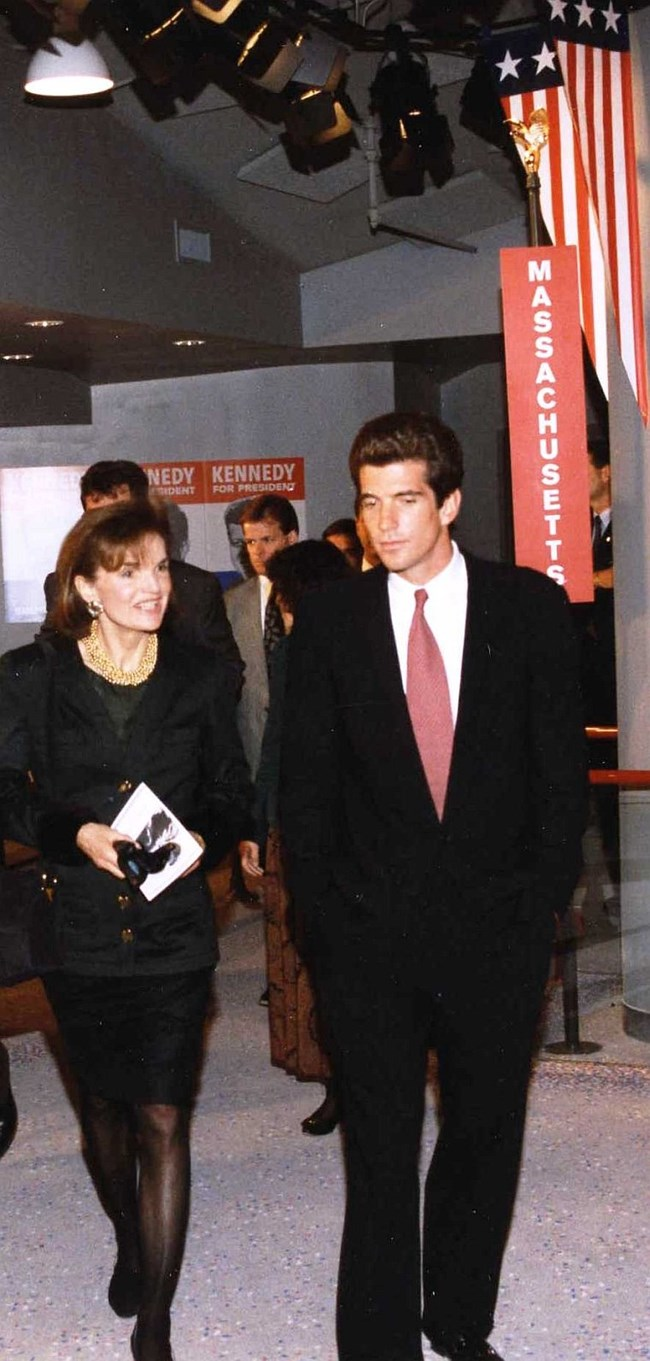
Kennedy (right) and his mother, Jacqueline, at the John F. Kennedy Presidential Library and Museum in Boston, October 1993

Kennedy addressed the 1988 Democratic National Convention in Atlanta, introducing his uncle Senator Ted Kennedy of Massachusetts. He invoked his father's inaugural address, calling "a generation to public service", and received a two-minute standing ovation. Republican consultant Richard Viguerie said he did not remember a word of the speech, but remembered "a good delivery", adding, "I think it was a plus for the Democrats and the boy. He is strikingly handsome."

Kennedy participated in his cousin Patrick J. Kennedy's campaign for a seat in the Rhode Island House of Representatives by visiting the district. He sat outside the polling booth and had his picture taken with "would-be" voters, a tactic that proved so effective that Patrick used it again in 1994.

Kennedy also campaigned in Boston for his uncle's re-election to the U.S. Senate against challenger Mitt Romney in 1994. "He always created a stir when he arrived in Massachusetts", remarked Senator Kennedy.

In 1994, Kennedy bought a loft in the Tribeca district of New York City (20 North Moore Street).

=== Relationships ===
While attending Brown University, Kennedy met Sally Munro. They dated for six years and visited India together in 1983. While at Brown, he also met model and actress Brooke Shields, with whom he was later linked.

Kennedy dated models Cindy Crawford and Julie Baker and actress Sarah Jessica Parker, who said she enjoyed dating Kennedy but realized he "was a public domain kind of a guy." Parker said she had no idea what "real fame" was until dating Kennedy and felt she should "apologize for dating him" since it became the "defining factor" of who she was. Kennedy met Parker through her brothers Toby and Pippin Parker, co-founders of the Naked Angels theatre company. Kennedy served on the company's board during the 1990s, a connection made through his friend and founding member Jack Merrill.

Kennedy had known actress Daryl Hannah since their families had vacationed together in Saint Martin in the early 1980s. After meeting again at the wedding of his aunt Lee Radziwill in 1988, they dated for five and a half years, though their relationship was complicated by her feelings for singer Jackson Browne, with whom she had lived for a time.

From 1985 to 1990, Kennedy dated Christina Haag. They had known each other as children, and she also attended Brown University.

=== Marriage ===
After his relationship with Hannah ended, Kennedy lived with Carolyn Bessette, who worked in the fashion industry. They were engaged for a year, though Kennedy consistently denied reports of this. Kennedy was celebrity co-chair of Naked Angels' annual Valentine's Day benefit, and it was at the 1995 benefit that he was photographed with Bessette; the two married the following year. On September 21, 1996, they were married in a private ceremony on Cumberland Island, Georgia, where his sister Caroline was matron of honor and his cousin Anthony Radziwill was best man. His nieces Rose Kennedy Schlossberg and Tatiana Kennedy Schlossberg served as flower girls, and nephew Jack Kennedy Schlossberg served as ring bearer.

The next day, Kennedy's cousin Patrick revealed that the pair had married. When they returned to their Manhattan home, a mass of reporters was waiting. One asked Kennedy if he had enjoyed his honeymoon, to which he replied: "Very much." He added, "Getting married is a big adjustment for us, and for a private citizen like Carolyn even more so. I ask you to give her all the privacy and room you can."

Bessette-Kennedy was disoriented by the constant attention of the paparazzi. The couple was permanently on display, both at Manhattan events and on their travels to visit celebrities such as Mariuccia Mandelli and Gianni Versace. She complained about being unable to get a job without being accused of exploiting her fame. The couple began seeing a marriage counselor in March 1999 and sought guidance from Cardinal John O'Connor in the summer of 1999.

== Death ==
Kennedy had wanted to become a pilot since childhood. He took flying lessons at the Flight Safety Academy in Vero Beach, Florida, and received his pilot's license in April 1998. The death of his cousin Michael L. Kennedy in a skiing accident prompted him to pause his lessons for three months. His sister Caroline hoped the break would be permanent, but when he resumed, she did little to stop him.

On July 16, 1999, Kennedy departed from Fairfield, New Jersey, at the controls of his Piper Saratoga light aircraft. He was traveling with his wife, Carolyn, and sister-in-law Lauren Bessette. Lauren was to be dropped off at Martha's Vineyard, after which Kennedy and his wife would continue on to Hyannis Port, Massachusetts, to attend the wedding of his cousin Rory Kennedy. He had purchased the plane from Air Bound Aviation on April 28. Carolyn and Lauren were seated in the second row. Kennedy checked in with the control tower at Martha's Vineyard Airport, but the plane was reported missing after it failed to arrive on schedule.

Officials were not optimistic about finding survivors after aircraft debris and a black suitcase belonging to Lauren were recovered from the Atlantic Ocean. President Bill Clinton offered support to the Kennedy family during the search.

On July 18, a United States Coast Guard admiral declared an end to rescue efforts. Over the next two days, fragments of the aircraft were located by the National Oceanic and Atmospheric Administration vessel Rude using side-scan sonar, prompting United States Navy divers to descend into the 62 °F (17 °C) water. They found parts of the shattered plane scattered across the seabed 120 feet (37 m) below the surface. The search ended in the late afternoon of July 21, when high‑resolution images of the ocean floor enabled Navy divers to recover the three bodies. They were taken by motorcade to the county medical examiner's office. Divers found Carolyn's and Lauren's bodies near the twisted fuselage, while Kennedy's body remained strapped into the pilot's seat. Admiral Richard M. Larrabee of the Coast Guard said all three bodies were "near and under" the fuselage, still strapped in.

The National Transportation Safety Board determined that pilot error was the probable cause of the crash: "Kennedy's failure to maintain control of the airplane during a descent over water at night, which was a result of spatial disorientation."

Later that evening, the bodies were autopsied at the county medical examiner's office and taken from Hyannis to Duxbury, Massachusetts, where they were cremated at the Mayflower Cemetery crematorium. The families announced plans for memorial services the same day. The autopsy determined that all three had died upon impact. Ted Kennedy favored a public service for John, while Caroline insisted on family privacy. On the morning of July 22, their ashes were scattered at sea from the Navy destroyer USS Briscoe off the coast of Martha's Vineyard.

A memorial service was held for Kennedy on July 23, at the Church of St. Thomas More in New York City, a parish he had often attended with his mother and sister. The invitation-only service was attended by hundreds of mourners, including President Clinton, who presented the family with photo albums of John and Carolyn from their visit to the White House the previous year.

=== Will ===
Kennedy's last will and testament stipulated that his personal belongings, property, and holdings were to be "evenly distributed" among his sister Caroline's three children—Rose, Tatiana, and Jack—who were among 14 beneficiaries. A scrimshaw set that had belonged to his father was left to his nephew Jack.

== Legacy ==
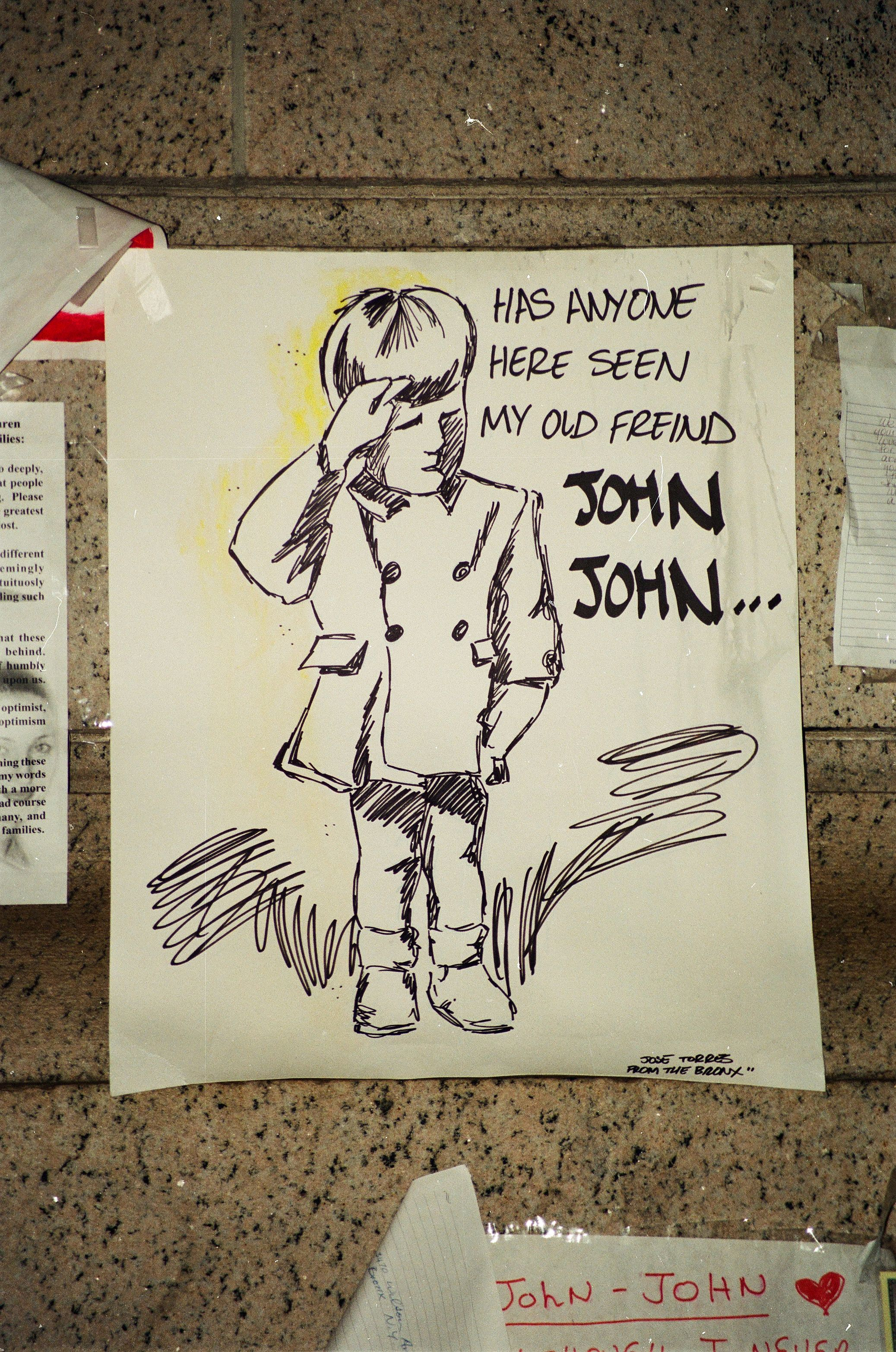
A drawing of three-year-old JFK Jr. saluting his father's coffin, placed on a memorial wall for him shortly after his death

In 2000, Reaching Up—the organization Kennedy founded in 1989—joined with the City University of New York to establish the John F. Kennedy Jr. Institute. In 2003, the ARCO Forum at Harvard Kennedy School was renamed the John F. Kennedy Jr. Forum of Public Affairs. Kennedy had served on the Senior Advisory Committee of Harvard's Institute of Politics for 15 years and was an active participant in Forum events. Ted Kennedy said the renaming symbolically linked him with his late father, while Caroline said it reflected her brother's love of discussing politics.

In 2013, on the 50th anniversary of the assassination of President John F. Kennedy, the New York Daily News re-ran the famous photograph of the three-year-old John Jr. saluting his father's coffin during the funeral procession. Photographer Dan Farrell, who took the image, called it "the saddest thing I've ever seen in my whole life". In 2025, CNN aired American Prince: JFK Jr., a three-part documentary about his life.

In 2026, Kennedy was portrayed by Paul Anthony Kelly in Love Story, a nine-episode television series depicting the whirlwind courtship and marriage of Kennedy and Carolyn Bessette-Kennedy.

== See also ==
- Kennedy curse
- America's Prince: The John F. Kennedy Jr. Story
