= George (magazine) =

Defunct American magazine by John F Kennedy Jr

- First issue
- Categories: Politics magazine
- Frequency: Monthly
- First issue: September 1995
- Final issue: January 2001
- Company: Hachette Filipacchi Media U.S.
- Country: United States
- Based in: New York City
- Language: English
- ISSN: 1084-662X

George was a monthly magazine centered on the theme of politics-as-lifestyle founded by John F. Kennedy Jr. and Michael J. Berman with publisher Hachette Filipacchi Media U.S. in New York City in September 1995. Its tagline was "not just politics as usual". It was published from 1995 to 2001.

== Overview ==
For the debut issue, creative director Matt Berman (no relation to co-founder Michael Berman) conceived a cover which received a great deal of attention for its image of Cindy Crawford dressed as George Washington photographed by Herb Ritts.

George departed from the format of traditional political publications, whose audience primarily comprised people in or around the political world. The general template for George was similar to magazines such as Rolling Stone, Esquire or Vanity Fair. The consistent underlying theme was to marry the themes of celebrity and media with the subject of politics in such a way that the general public would find political news and discourse about politics more interesting to read.

=== Notable contributors ===
- Paul Begala
- Roger Black
- George Clooney
- Kellyanne Conway
- Ann Coulter
- Al D'Amato
- Lisa DePaulo
- Al Franken
- Stephen Glass
- Rush Limbaugh
- Norman Mailer
- Chris Matthews
- Steve Miller
- Cathy Scott
- W. Thomas Smith Jr.
- Jackie Stallone
- Naomi Wolf

== Reception ==
External videos
- Washington Journal interview with George executive editor Elizabeth Mitchell, August 18, 1997, C-SPAN
- Washington Journal discussion of the George media issue with George editor Gary Ginsberg, Matt Drudge, and Hanna Rosin, April 25, 1998, C-SPAN

When it first appeared, George attracted great interest, and for a brief period had the largest circulation of any political magazine in the nation, partly due to the celebrity status of Kennedy, but it soon began losing money. Kennedy and George occasionally courted controversy to boost sales, one notable example being the 1997 issue wherein Kennedy in his editorial lambasted his cousins Michael Kennedy and Joe Kennedy II, whose marital scandals had recently made news, as "poster boys for bad behavior".

Kennedy later complained that the magazine was not taken seriously in the publishing world.

Critics called George "the political magazine for people who don't understand politics," assailing it for "stripping any and all discussion of political issues from its coverage of politics". In a feature in its final issue, Spy magazine asserted that the magazine's premise was flawed because, "Politics overlapped with Pop Culture in such a limited number of ways". That fairly critical profile in Spy described George as "scrambling for celebrities 'with tits' as often as possible to put on the cover and then trying to figure out what that person had to do with politics".

== Decline ==
By early 1997, Kennedy and Berman were locked in a power struggle, which led to screaming matches, slammed doors and even a physical altercation. Berman sold his share of the company and Kennedy took on his responsibilities. Berman's departure was followed by a rapid drop in sales for the already declining magazine.

Hachette Filipacchi Magazines were partners in George. CEO David Pecker said the decline was due to Kennedy's refusal to "take risks as an editor, despite the fact that he was an extraordinary risk taker in other areas of his life." Pecker also said, "He understood that the target audience for George was the 18-34 year-old demographic, yet he would routinely turn down interviews that would appeal to this age group like Princess Diana or John Gotti Jr. to interview subjects like Dan Rostenkowski or Võ Nguyên Giáp." Shortly before his death, Kennedy had been planning a series of online chats with the 2000 presidential candidates. Microsoft was to provide the technology and pay for it while receiving advertising in George.

After Kennedy died in a plane crash in July 1999, Hachette Filipacchi Magazines purchased Kennedy's portion of the magazine from his estate and continued for over a year with Frank Lalli as editor-in-chief. With falling advertising sales, the magazine ceased publication in January 2001, almost two years after Kennedy's death.

External videos
- Tenth anniversary discussion at Kennedy School of Government, Harvard University, C-SPAN

In 2005, Harvard Kennedy School held a panel discussion titled "Not Just Politics as Usual", which commemorated the 10th anniversary of the magazine's launch. The panel was moderated by Tom Brokaw and featured appearances by other journalists.

=== Back-issue popularity ===
A February 1997 edition of George with the tagline "Survival Guide to the Future", in which Kennedy interviews Bill Gates, has become well sought after by adherents of the QAnon conspiracy theory with one copy online being listed at $3,499.99.
