= Sarah Pidgeon =

American actress (born 1996)

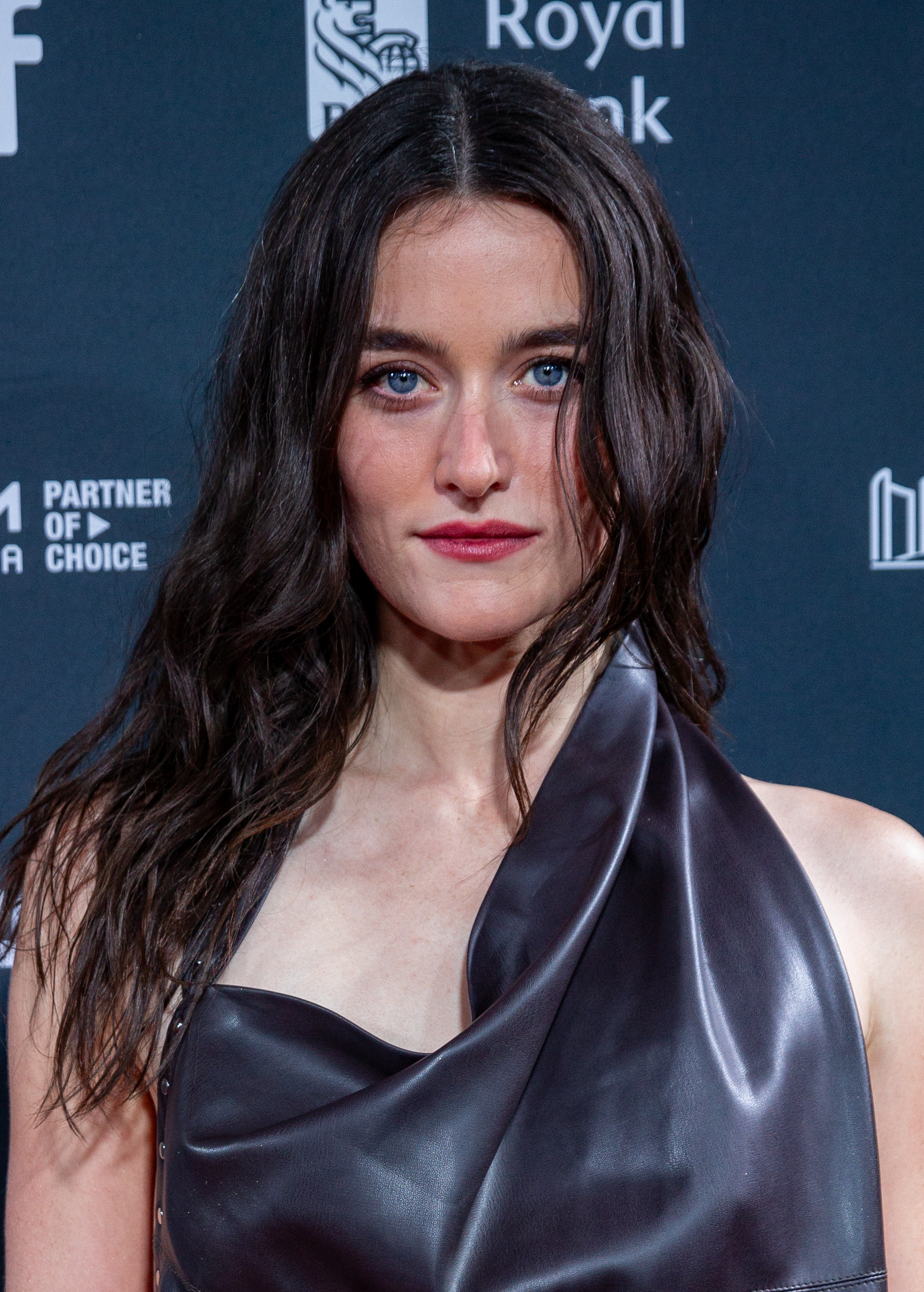
- Pidgeon in 2024
- Born: July 7, 1996 (age 30); Birmingham, Michigan, U.S.
- Education: Carnegie Mellon University (BFA)
- Occupation: Actress
- Years active: 2014–present

Sarah Pidgeon (born July 7, 1996) is an American actress. She has played roles in the Amazon Prime Video series The Wilds (2020–2022) and the Hulu series Tiny Beautiful Things (2023). She made her Broadway debut in the David Adjmi play Stereophonic (2024), earning a Tony Award nomination for Best Featured Actress in a Play and starred in I Know What You Did Last Summer (2025). Pidgeon received critical acclaim for portraying Carolyn Bessette-Kennedy in the FX/Hulu drama series Love Story (2026), for which she was nominated for the Primetime Emmy Award for Outstanding Lead Actress in a Limited or Anthology Series or Movie in 2026.

== Early life and education ==
Pidgeon grew up in Michigan where she attended the Birmingham Groves High School. She attended Interlochen Arts Camp during summer holidays and performed in plays at the Community House in Birmingham. Pidgeon then attended the Interlochen Arts Academy and graduated in 2014 before gaining a bachelor of fine arts degree from the Carnegie Mellon School of Drama in Pittsburgh in 2018.

== Career ==
In 2019, after appearances in One Dollar and Gotham, Pidgeon was cast in Amazon Prime Video series The Wilds. In the young adult survivalist series, she played the "mature and intellectual" Leah. Her performance was said in Collider to display her character's "obsession with figuring out the truth has her operating at an 11, fraught with tension, almost every single second of the show" and that: "Pidgeon's ability to hit that level and keep herself there with such raw intensity is remarkable."

In August 2022, Pidgeon was announced to have been cast in the television series Tiny Beautiful Things. She has received critical praise for her portrayal of the younger version of Kathryn Hahn's character Clare, with Lucy Mangan in The Guardian describing the role as "brilliantly played". She has said that she and Hahn "had conversations about who Clare is, how her heart beats, and what energy she brings. A lot of that is in the writing as well." Portraying Clare's experiences, it has been said that: "Pidgeon balances grief, love, and maturity in a truly gentle yet striking way." Pidgeon described the character as "extremely volatile and destructive. She's very sure of what she says and how she feels."

Pidgeon played Diana in the David Adjmi play Stereophonic, which first ran Off-Broadway at Playwrights Horizons, followed by a transfer on Broadway at the John Golden Theatre. Frank Rizzo of Variety described her performance as "remarkable". Gloria Oladipo of The Guardian described Pidgeon's performance as "precise", "vivid", and "gripping". She was nominated for the 2024 Tony Award for Best Featured Actress in a Play.

In 2026, Pidgeon portrayed Carolyn Bessette-Kennedy in the first season of Love Story, initially titled American Love Story.

== Acting credits ==
=== Film ===
Year	Title	Role	Notes
2024	Lazareth	Maeve	
2024	The Friend	Val	
2025	I Know What You Did Last Summer	Stevie Ward	
TBA	Honeymoon with Harry	Haley	Post–production

=== Television ===
Year	Title	Role	Notes	Ref.
2018	One Dollar	Party Girl	Episode: "Garrett Drimmer"	
2019	Gotham	Jane Cartwright / Jane Doe	Episode: "Legend of the Dark Knight: Nothing's Shocking"	
2020–2022	The Wilds	Leah Rilke	Main role; 18 episodes	
2023	Tiny Beautiful Things	Young Clare Pierce	Main role; 8 episodes	
2026	Love Story	Carolyn Bessette-Kennedy	Lead role; 9 episodes	

=== Theatre ===
Year	Title	Role	Venue	Notes	Ref.
2023	Stereophonic	Diana	Playwrights Horizons	Off-Broadway	
2024	Stereophonic	Diana	John Golden Theatre	Broadway	

== Awards and nominations ==
Year	Award	Category	Work	Result	Ref.
2024	Astra TV Awards	Best Supporting Actress in a Limited Series or Streaming Movie	Tiny Beautiful Things	Nominated	
2024	Dorian Theater Awards	Outstanding Featured Performance in a Broadway Play	Stereophonic	Won (Note: Tied with Kara Young for Purlie Victorious)	
2024	Drama League Awards	Distinguished Performance	Stereophonic	Nominated	
2024	Outer Critics Circle Awards	Outstanding Featured Performer in a Play	Stereophonic	Nominated	
2024	Theatre World Awards	Outstanding Broadway or Off-Broadway Debut Performance	Stereophonic	Honored (Note: This award does not have a single winner, but recognizes multiple individuals.)	
2024	Tony Awards	Best Performance by an Actress in a Featured Role in a Play	Stereophonic	Nominated	
2026	Astra TV Awards	Best Actress in a Limited Series or TV Movie	Love Story: John F. Kennedy Jr. & Carolyn Bessette	Nominated	
2026	Gotham TV Awards	Outstanding Lead Performance in a Limited or Anthology Series	Love Story: John F. Kennedy Jr. & Carolyn Bessette	Nominated	
2026	Gotham TV Awards	Ensemble Tribute	Love Story: John F. Kennedy Jr. & Carolyn Bessette	Honored	
2026	Primetime Emmy Awards	Outstanding Lead Actress in a Limited or Anthology Series or Movie	Love Story: John F. Kennedy Jr. & Carolyn Bessette	Nominated	
