= Piper PA-28 Cherokee =

Family of light single engine aircraft

PA-28 Cherokee
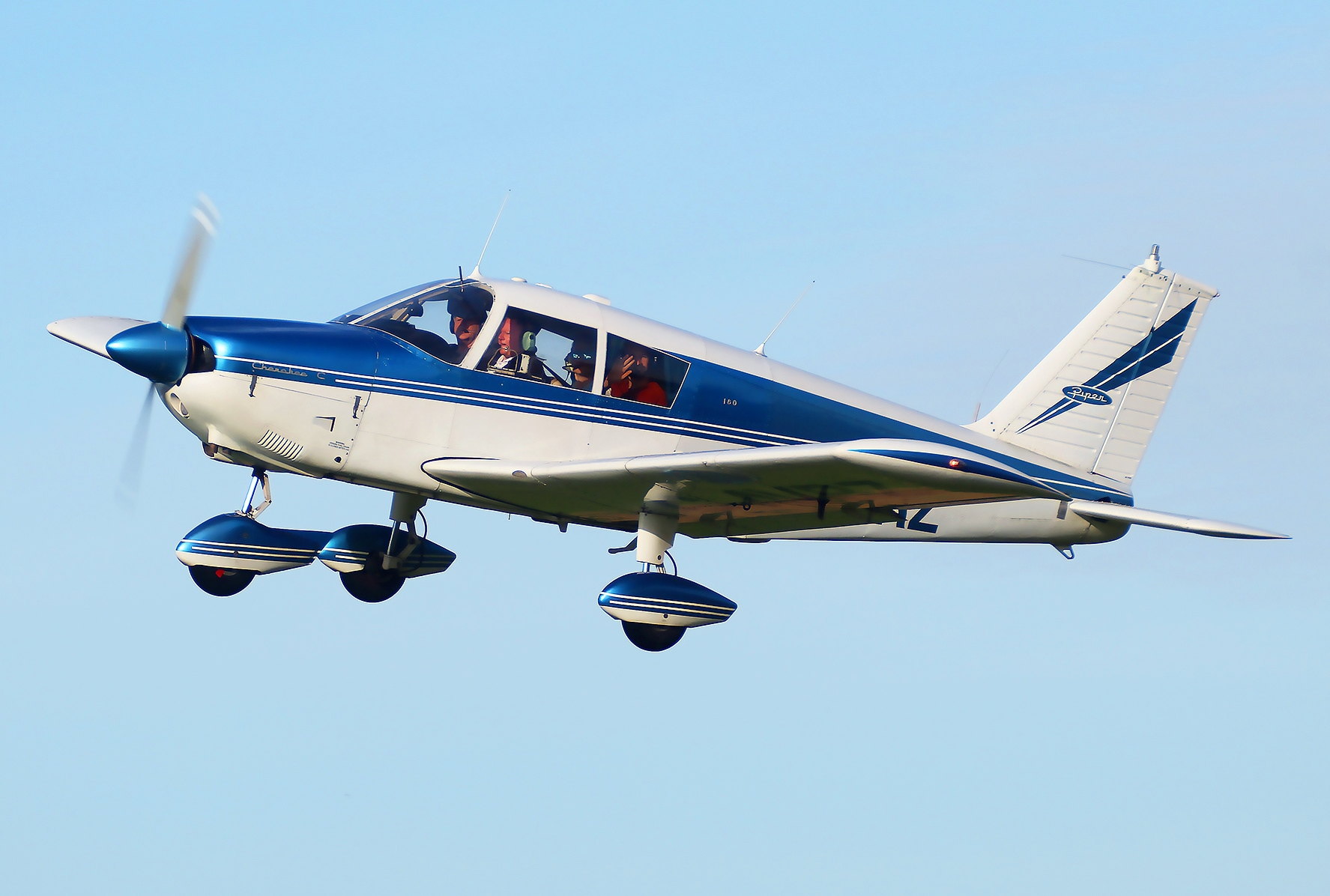
- Piper PA-28-180 Cherokee C

General information
- Type: Civil utility aircraft
- Manufacturer: Piper Aircraft
- Number built: 32,778+

History
- Manufactured: 1961–present
- Introduction date: 1960
- First flight: January 14, 1960
- Developed into: Piper PA-32 Cherokee Six

The Piper PA-28 Cherokee is a family of two-seat or four-seat light aircraft built by Piper Aircraft and designed for flight training, air taxi, and personal use. The PA-28 family of aircraft comprises all-metal, unpressurized, single piston-engined airplanes with low mounted wings and tricycle landing gear. They have a single door on the right side, which is entered by stepping on the wing.

The PA-28 is the fourth most produced aircraft in history. The first PA-28 received its type certificate from the Federal Aviation Administration in 1960 and the series remains in production to this day. The Archer was discontinued in 2009, but with investment from new company ownership, the model was put back into production in 2010. As of 2026, five models were in production; the Archer TX and LX, the diesel-powered Archer DX and DLX, and the Pilot 100i.

The PA-28 series competed with the now discontinued, similarly low-winged Grumman American AA-5 series and Beechcraft Musketeer designs and continues to compete with the high-winged Cessna 172.

Piper has created variations within the Cherokee family by installing engines ranging from 140 to 300 hp (105–220 kW), offering turbocharging, retractable landing gear, constant-speed propellers and stretching the fuselage to accommodate six people. The Piper PA-32 (initially known as the "Cherokee Six") is a larger, six-seat variant of the PA-28. The PA-32R Saratoga variant was in production until 2009.

== Development ==
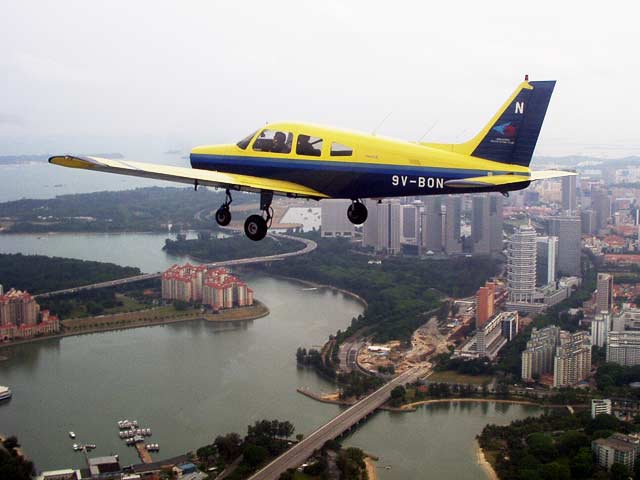
The PA-28-161 Warrior II flying in the livery of the Singapore Youth Flying Club

At the time of the Cherokee's introduction, Piper's primary single-engined, all-metal aircraft was the Piper PA-24 Comanche, a larger, faster aircraft with retractable landing gear and a constant-speed propeller. Karl Bergey, Fred Weick and John Thorp designed the Cherokee as a less expensive alternative to the Comanche, with lower manufacturing and parts costs to compete with the Cessna 172, although some later Cherokees also featured retractable gear and constant-speed propellers. The Cherokee and Comanche lines continued in parallel production, serving different market segments for over a decade, until Comanche production was ended in 1972, to be replaced by the Piper PA-32R family.

=== Original design ===
The original Cherokees were the Cherokee 150 and 160 hp (110 and 120 kW) (PA-28-150 and PA-28-160), which started production in 1961 (unless otherwise mentioned, the model number always refers to horsepower).

In 1962, Piper added the Cherokee 180 (PA-28-180) powered by a 180 hp (130 kW) Lycoming O-360 engine. The extra power made it practical to fly with all four seats filled (depending on passenger weight and fuel loading) and the model remains popular on the used-airplane market. In 1968, the cockpit was modified to replace the "push-pull"-style engine throttle controls with quadrant levers. In addition, a third window was added to each side, giving the fuselage the more modern look seen in most recent production.

Piper continued to expand the line rapidly. In 1963, the company introduced the even more powerful Cherokee 235 (PA-28-235), which competed favorably with the Cessna 182 Skylane for load-carrying capability. The Cherokee 235 featured a Lycoming O-540 engine de-rated to 235 horsepower (175 kW) and a longer wing which would eventually be used for the Cherokee Six. It included tip tanks of 17 US gallons (64 L) capacity each, bringing the total fuel capacity of the Cherokee 235 to 84 US gallons (320 L). The aircraft had its fuselage stretched in 1973, giving more leg room in the rear. The stabilator area was also increased. In 1973, the marketing name was changed from "235" to "Charger". In 1974, it was changed again to "Pathfinder". Production of the Pathfinder continued until 1977. No 1978 models were built. In 1979, the aircraft was given the Piper tapered wing and the name was changed again, this time to Dakota.

In 1964, the company filled in the bottom end of the line with the Cherokee 140 hp (100 kW) (PA-28-140), which was designed for training and initially shipped with only two seats. The PA-28-140 engine was slightly modified shortly after its introduction to produce 150 hp (110 kW), but kept the -140 name.

In 1967, Piper introduced the PA-28R-180 Cherokee Arrow. This aircraft featured a constant-speed propeller and a retractable landing gear and was powered by a 180 hp (130 kW) Lycoming IO-360-B1E engine. A 200 hp (150 kW) version powered by a Lycoming IO-360-C1C was offered as an option beginning in 1969 and designated the PA-28R-200; the 180 hp (130 kW) model was dropped after 1971. At the time the Arrow was introduced, Piper removed the Cherokee 150 and Cherokee 160 from production.

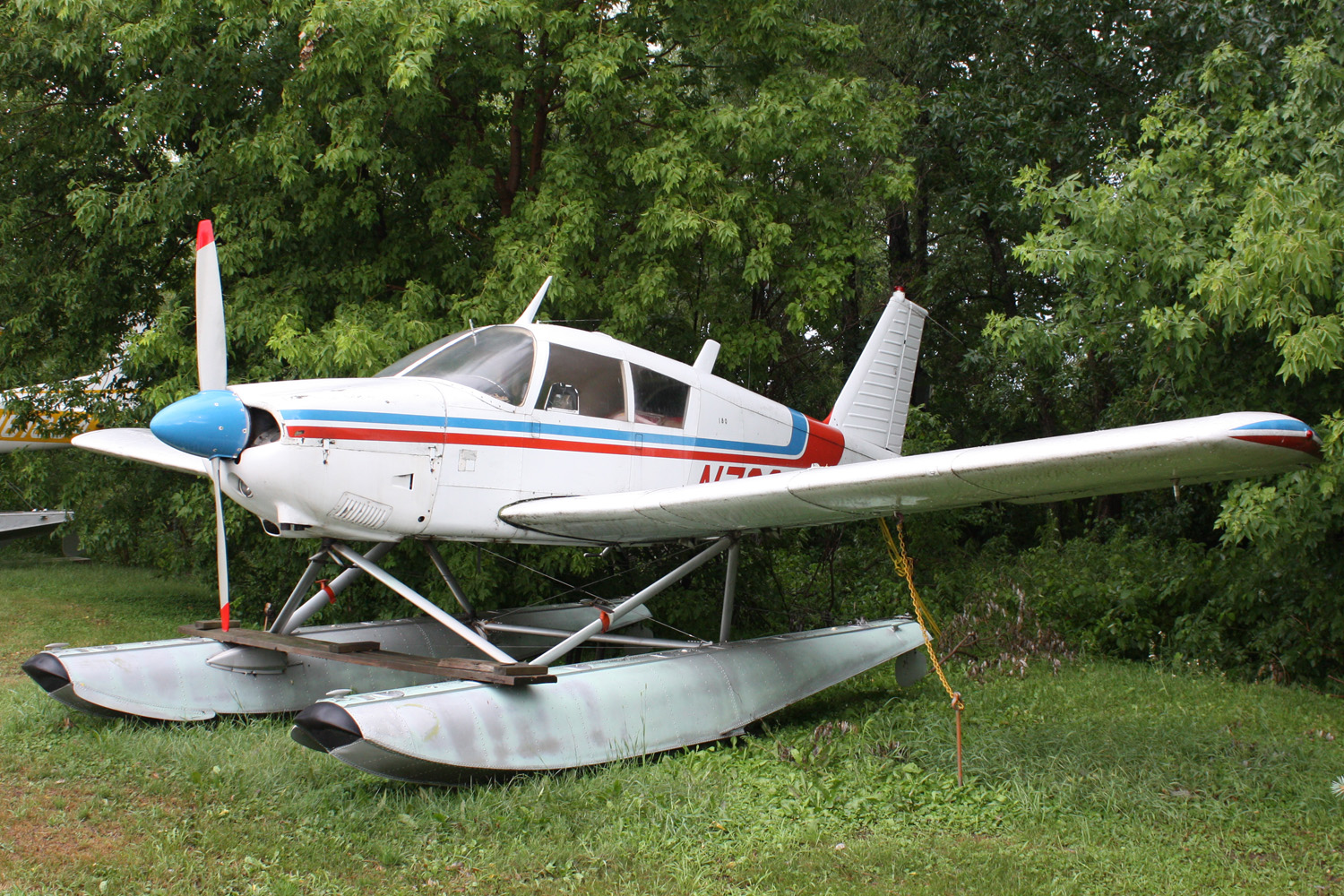
PA-28-180 on floats

The Arrow II came out in 1972, featuring a 5 in (130 mm) fuselage stretch to increase legroom for the rear-seat passengers. In 1977, Piper introduced the Arrow III (PA-28R-201), which featured a semi-tapered wing and longer stabilator, a design feature that had previously been introduced successfully on the PA-28-181 which provided better low-speed handling. It also featured larger fuel tanks, increasing capacity from 50 to 77 US gallons (190 to 290 L).

The first turbocharged model, the PA-28R-201T, was also offered in 1977, powered by a six-cylinder Continental TSIO-360-F engine equipped with a Rajay turbocharger. A three-bladed propeller was optional.

In 1979, the Arrow was restyled again as the PA-28RT-201 Arrow IV, featuring a "T" tail.

In 1971, Piper released a Cherokee 140 variant called the Cherokee Cruiser 2+2. Although the plane kept the 140 designation, it was, in fact, a 150 hp (110 kW) plane and was shipped mainly as a four-seat version. In 1973, the Cherokee 180 was named the Cherokee Challenger and had its fuselage lengthened slightly and its wings widened and the Cherokee 235 was named the Charger with similar airframe modifications. In 1974, Piper changed the marketing names of some of the Cherokee models again, renaming the Cruiser 2+2 (140) simply the Cruiser, the Challenger to the Archer (model PA-28-181), and the Charger (235) to Pathfinder.

Piper reintroduced the Cherokee 150 in 1974, renaming it the Cherokee Warrior (PA-28-151) and giving it the Archer's stretched body and a new, semi-tapered wing.

In 1977, Piper stopped producing the Cruiser (140) and Pathfinder (235), but introduced a new 235 hp (175 kW) plane, the Dakota (PA-28-236), based on the Cherokee 235, Charger, and Pathfinder models, but with the new semi-tapered wing.

The PA-28-201T Turbo Dakota followed the introduction of the PA-28-236 Dakota in 1979. The airframe was essentially the same as a fixed-gear Arrow III and was powered by a turbocharged Continental TSIO-360-FB engine producing 200 hp (150 kW). The aircraft did not sell well and production ended in 1980.

In 1977, Piper upgraded the Warrior to 160 hp (120 kW) PA-28-161, changing its name to Cherokee Warrior II. This aircraft had slightly improved aerodynamic wheel fairings introduced in 1978. Later models of the Warrior II, manufactured after July 1982, incorporated a gross weight increase to 2,440 pounds (1,110 kg), giving a useful load over 900 lb (410 kg). This same aircraft, now available with a glass cockpit, was available as the Warrior III and was marketed as a training aircraft.

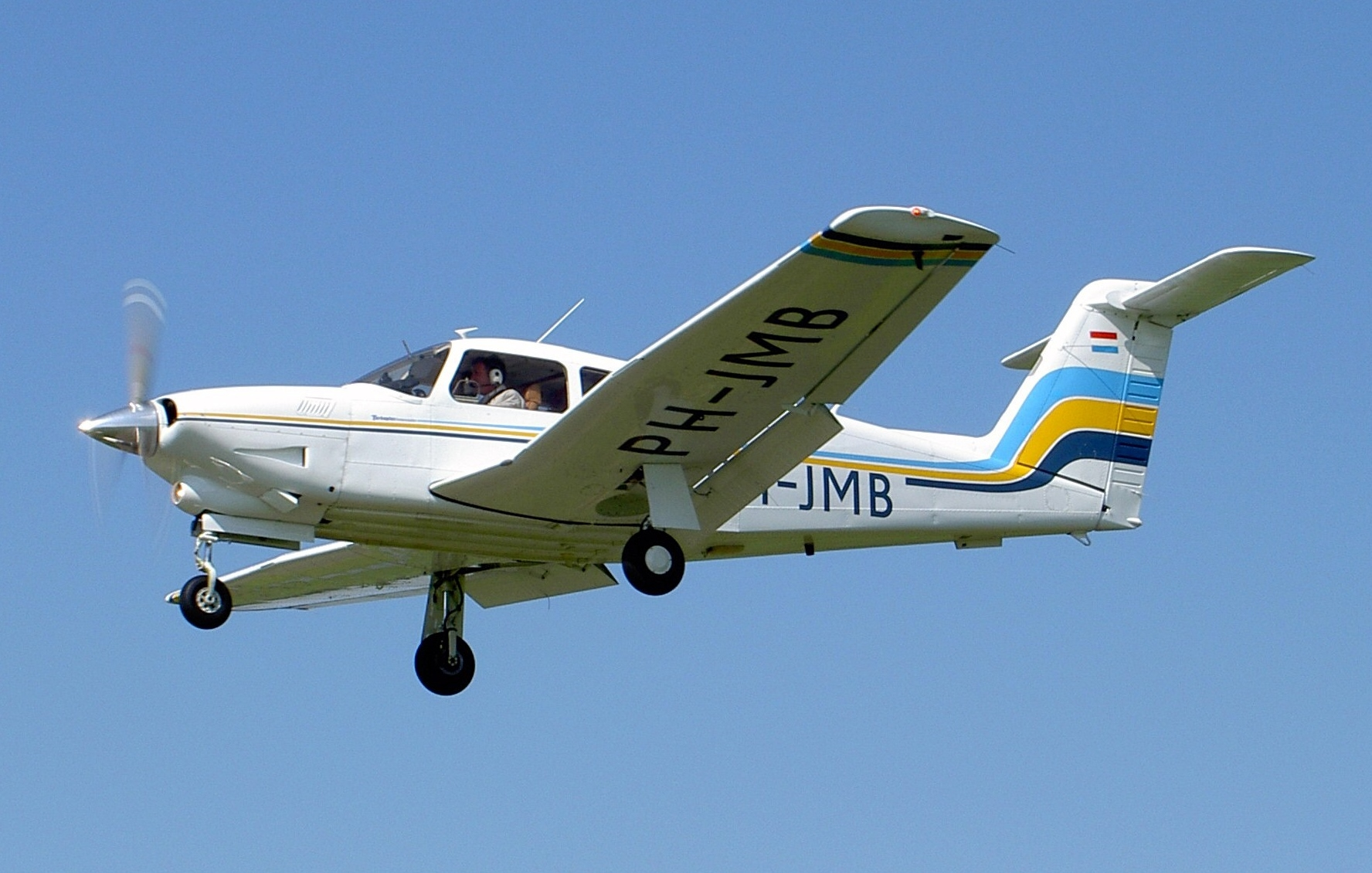
Piper PA-28RT-201T Turbo Arrow IV with its distinctive "T" tail, and retractable landing gear

=== PA-32 ===
In 1965, Piper developed the Piper Cherokee Six, designated the PA-32, by stretching the PA-28 design. It features a lengthened fuselage and seating for one pilot and five passengers.

=== Brazilian, Argentine and Chilean production ===
PA-28s were built under license in Brazil as the Embraer EMB-711A and EMB-711C Corisco (PA-28R-200), EMB-711B (PA-28R-201), EMB-711T (PA-28RT-201) and EMB-711ST Corisco Turbo (PA-28RT-201T) and the EMB-712 Tupi (PA-28-181). Chincul SACAIFI of San Juan, Argentina produced the type in Argentina, building 960 airplanes between 1972 and 1995, including the Cherokee Archer, Dakota, Arrow and Turbo Arrow. The PA-28-236 Dakota was also assembled under license by the Maintenance Wing of the Chilean Air Force (later reorganised as ENAER). By September 1982, 20 Dakotas had been assembled in Chile.

=== Piper aircraft variants ===
The original Piper Aircraft company declared bankruptcy in 1991. In 1995, the New Piper Aircraft company was created. It was renamed Piper Aircraft once again in 2006. The company originally produced one variant, the 180-horsepower (134 kW) Archer LX (PA-28-181), and began testing two diesel versions, with 135 and 155 hp.

As of 2022, five variants of the PA-28 were in production:

- Archer TX and LX with a 180 hp (134 kW) Lycoming IO-360-A4M engine, a 128 kn (237 km/h) TAS maximum cruise speed, 522 nmi (967 km) range and a Garmin G1000 avionics suite
- Archer DX and DLX with a 155 hp (116 kW) Continental CD-155 engine, a 123 kn (228 km/h) TAS maximum cruise speed, 848 nmi (1,570 km) range and a Garmin G1000 avionics suite
- Pilot 100i with a 180 hp (134 kW) Lycoming IO-360-B4A engine, a 128 kn (237 km/h) TAS maximum cruise speed, 522 nmi (967 km) range and Garmin G3X avionics.

== Design ==
=== Wing ===
Originally, all Cherokees had a constant-chord, rectangular planform wing, popularly called the "Hershey Bar" wing because of its resemblance to the convex, rectangular chocolate bar.

Beginning with the Warrior in 1974, Piper switched to a semi-tapered wing with the NACA 652-415 profile and a 2-foot-longer (0.61 m) wingspan. The constant chord is maintained from the root to mid-wing, at which point a tapered section sweeping backwards on the leading edge continues until the tip. Both Cherokee wing variants have an angled wing root; i.e., the wing chord is greater at the root, with the leading edge swept back as it leaves the fuselage body, rather than the wing meeting the body at a perpendicular angle.

Debate is ongoing about the relative benefits of the two wing shapes. According to the Cherokee's lead designer, Fred Weick, the semi-tapered wing was introduced to "improve stall characteristics and increase wingspan," and side-by-side testing of the two shapes found that with the semitapered wing, "the plane had better climb and flatter flight characteristics" The original 1974 version of the wing had a structural weakness that caused a structural failure during an aerobatic maneuver, but that was fixed for all later wings. According to Terry Lee Rogers (summarizing interviews with Weick), "the outboard wing sections had a different taper than the wing root, which permitted them to retain control even when the inboard sections were stalled."

However, designer John Thorp, who collaborated with Weick in the late 1950s on an early 180 hp version of the PA-28 (with Hershey-bar wings) and was not involved in the later semi-tapered design, publicly disagreed: "Tapered wings tend to stall outboard, reducing aileron effectiveness and increasing the likelihood of a rolloff into a spin."

Aviation journalist Peter Garrison also favors the Hershey-bar wing, saying that the semitapered shape has a neutral effect on drag: "to prevent tip stall, designers have resorted to providing the outboard portions of tapered wings with more cambered airfoil sections, drooped or enlarged leading edges, fixed or automatic leading edge slots or slats and most commonly, wing twist or 'washout'. The trouble with these fixes is that they all increase the drag, cancelling whatever benefit the tapered wing was supposed to deliver in the first place."

=== Flight controls ===
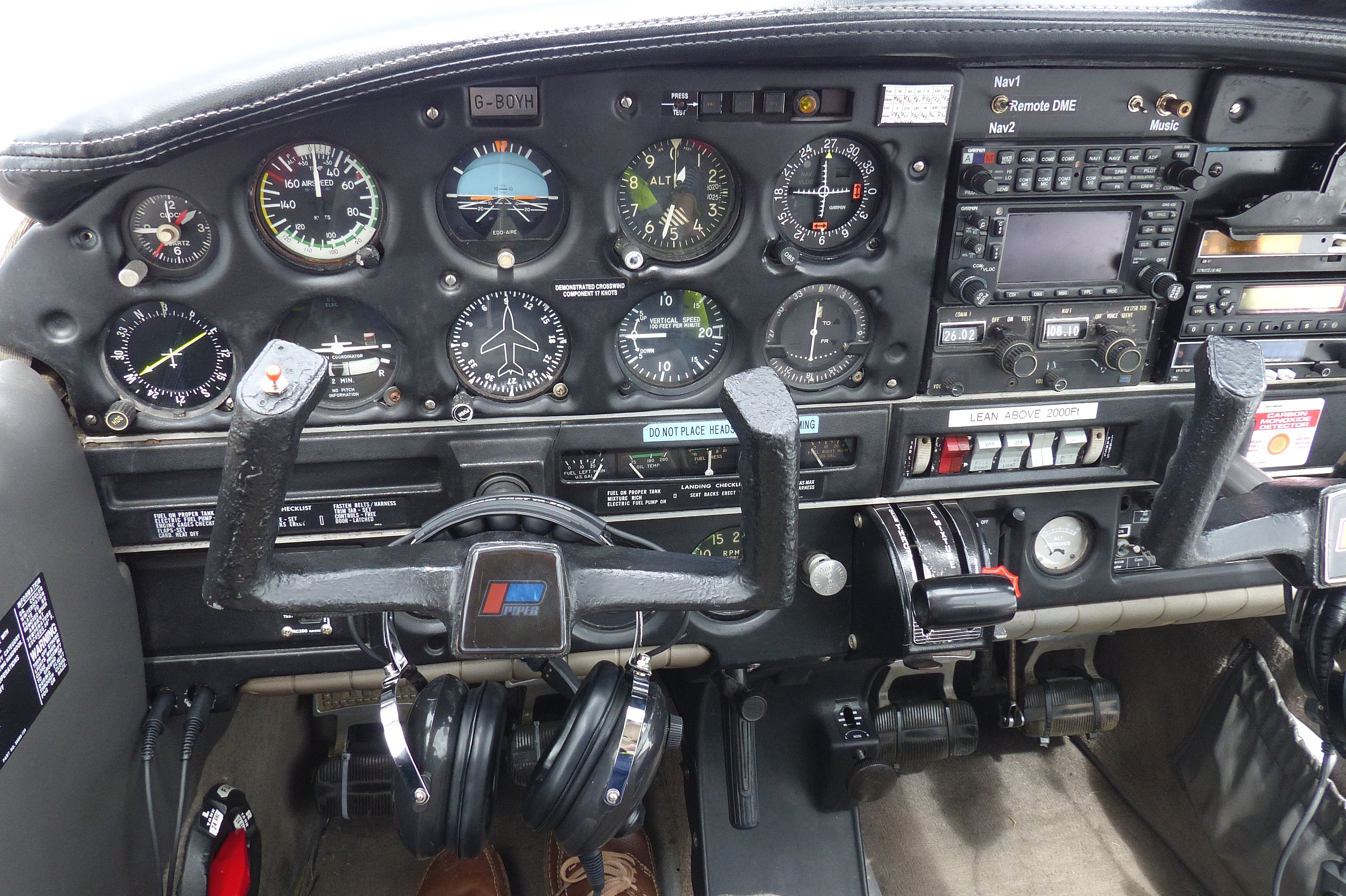
The cockpit of a Piper PA-28-151 Cherokee Warrior (2016)

For the Cherokee family, Piper used their traditional flight-control configuration. The horizontal tail is a stabilator with an antiservo tab (sometimes termed an antibalance tab). The antiservo tab moves in the same direction as the stabilator movement, making pitch control "heavier" as the stabilator moves out of the trimmed position. Flaps can extend up to 40°; 25° flaps are normally used for a short- or soft-field takeoff. The ailerons, flaps, stabilator and stabilator trim are all controlled using cables and pulleys.

In the cockpit, all Cherokees use control yokes rather than sticks, together with rudder pedals. The pilot operates the flaps manually using a Johnson bar located between the front seats: for zero degrees, the lever is flat against the floor and is pulled up to select the detent positions of 10, 25, and 40°.

Older Cherokees use an overhead crank for stabilator trim (correctly called an antiservo tab), while later ones use a trim wheel on the floor between the front seats, immediately behind the flap bar.

All Cherokees have a brake lever under the pilot side of the instrument panel. Differential toe brakes on the rudder pedals were an optional add-on for earlier Cherokees and became standard with later models.

Some earlier Cherokees used control knobs for the throttle, mixture, and propeller advance (where applicable), while later Cherokees use a collection of two or three control levers in a throttle quadrant.

Cherokees normally include a rudder trim knob, which actually controls a set of springs acting on the rudder pedals rather than an external trim tab on the rudder—in other words, the surface is trimmed by control tension rather than aerodynamically.

== Variants ==
=== "Hershey Bar" PA-28 ===
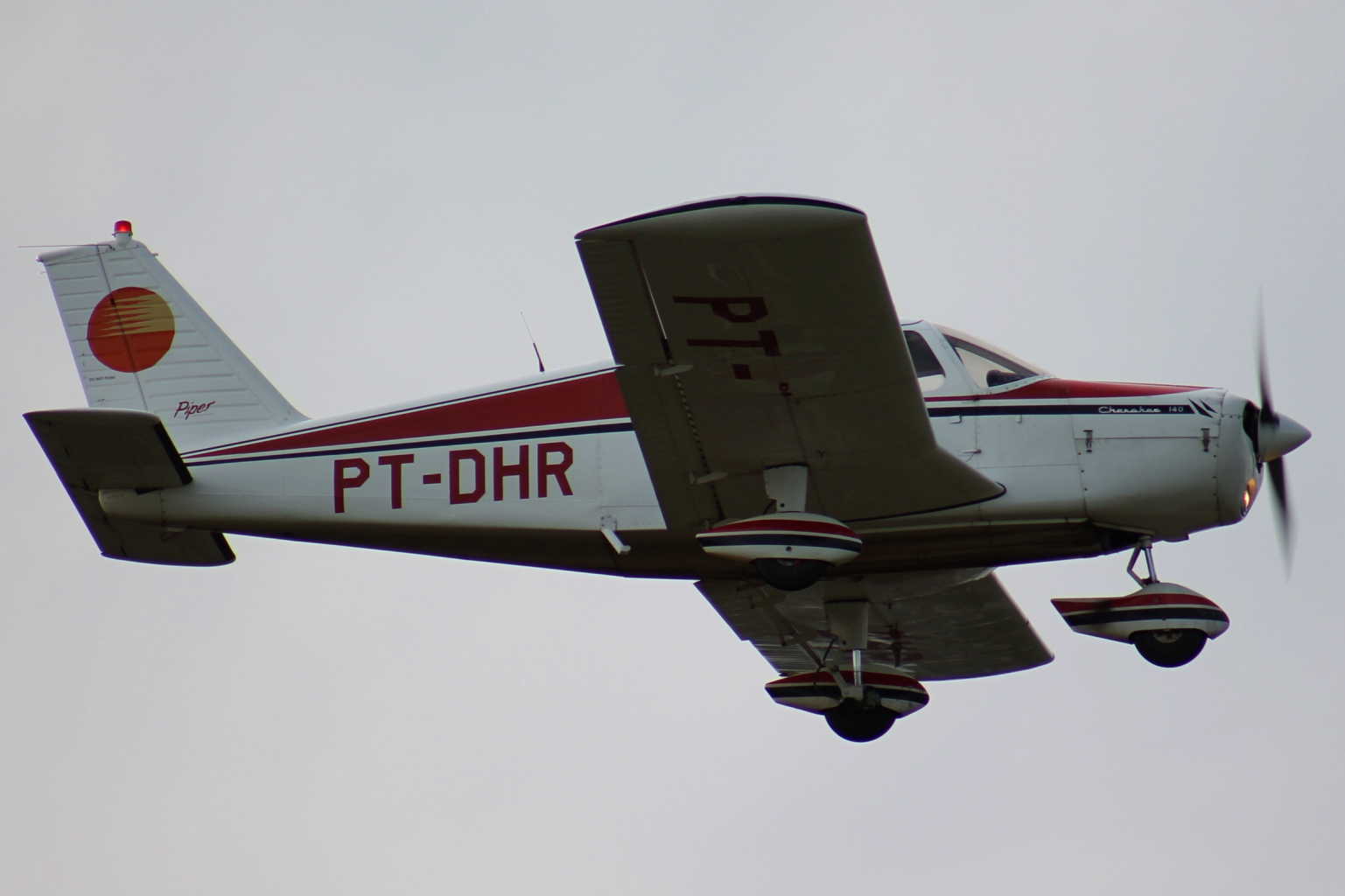
A PA-28-140 Cherokee Cruiser with the original constant-chord "Hershey Bar" wing.

Early PA-28 variants featured a distinctive constant-chord wing, which is often referred to as the "Hershey Bar" wing.

Aircraft of the original four-place Cherokee line consisted of three primary variants; the PA-28-150, PA-28-160, and PA-28-180. The PA-28-150 and PA-28-160 are respectively powered by 150 hp (112 kW) and 160 hp (119 kW) versions of the Lycoming O-320 engine, while the PA-28-180 is powered by the 180 hp (134 kW) Lycoming O-360 engine. The PA-28-160 was certified first with a gross weight of 2,200 lb (998 kg) on October 31, 1960. This was followed by the PA-28-150 with a gross weight of 2,150 lb (975 kg) on June 2, 1961. The PA-28-180 was certified with a gross weight of 2,400 lb (1,089 kg) on August 3, 1962. These variants were gradually upgraded during their production run. The PA-28S-160, variant of the PA-28-160 with EDO 2000 floats, was certified with a gross weight of 2,140 lb (971 kg) on February 25, 1963. The similar PA-28S-180, based on the PA-28-180, was certified with a gross weight of 2,222 lb (1,008 kg) on May 10, 1963.

Additional variants were added later, including the simplified PA-28-140 and the Lycoming O-540-powered PA-28-235.

PA-28 Cherokee
Original series of variants produced in 1961 and 1962. A total of 672 were built; 2 (1960 prototypes), 84 (1961), and 586 (1962).
- PA-28-150 Cherokee, 150 hp (112 kW) variant. The first Cherokee prototype was built to this standard and was powered by a Lycoming O-320-A2A engine, while production aircraft were powered by the O-320-A2B. Although the PA-28-150 flew before the PA-28-160, it was certified and entered production after its 160 hp counterpart.
- PA-28-160 Cherokee, 160 hp (119 kW) variant. The second Cherokee prototype was built to this standard and was powered by the Lycoming O-320-D2A engine. The first Cherokee prototype was later converted to this standard as well. Production PA-28-160s were powered by the O-320-B2B. The first 69 Cherokees built were PA-28-160s, after which it continued to be produced alongside the PA-28-150.
- PA-28-180 Cherokee, the first Cherokee prototype was fitted with a 180 hp (134 kW) Lycoming O-360-A2A engine in late 1961. Production of the 180 hp variant would not begin until the Cherokee B.
PA-28 Cherokee B
Improved variants with minor detail changes. Not including three conversions from 1962 Cherokees, a total of 1,091 were built; 858 (1963) and 233 (1964).
- PA-28-150B Cherokee B, 150 hp (112 kW) variant.
- PA-28-160B Cherokee B, 160 hp (119 kW) variant.
- PA-28S-160B Cherokee B, designation of the PA-28-160B when fitted with EDO 2000 floats. The prototype of this variant was converted from a 1962 Cherokee.
- PA-28-180B Cherokee B, first production 180 hp (134 kW) variant with a Lycoming O-360-A2A engine. One of the 1962 Cherokee conversions was to this standard.
- PA-28S-180B Cherokee B, designation of the PA-28-180B when fitted with EDO 2000 floats.
PA-28 Cherokee C
As Cherokee B but with numerous improvements, including a new interior with a new instrument panel, more baggage space, and more soundproofing, as well as a new cabin step and a fiberglass engine cowling. The Cherokee C was offered in three equipment trim levels; Custom, Executive, and Sportsman. Not including three conversions from Cherokee Bs, a total of 2,617 were built; 1,264 (1965), 811 (1966), and 542 (1967).
- PA-28-150C Cherokee C, 150 hp (112 kW) variant powered by a Lycoming O-320-E2A engine.
- PA-28-160C Cherokee C, 160 hp (119 kW) variant powered by a Lycoming O-320-D2A engine.
- PA-28S-160C Cherokee C, designation of the PA-28-160C when fitted with EDO 2000 floats.
- PA-28-180C Cherokee C, 180 hp (134 kW) variant powered by a Lycoming O-360-A3A engine.
- PA-28S-180C Cherokee C, designation of the PA-28-180C when fitted with EDO 2000 floats.
PA-28-180D Cherokee D
Improved variant with a third fuselage window, a lengthened propeller spinner, and an instrument panel. The PA-28-150 and PA-28-160 were discontinued after the 1967 production run, leaving only the 180 hp (134 kW) variant thereafter. A total of 1,122 were built; 902 (1968) and 220 (1969). These production figures include a number of kits provided to Aero Mercantil in Colombia for completion.
PA-28-180E Cherokee E
1970 model with an improved instrument panel and ventilation. Two prototypes were converted from Cherokee Ds and 259 production aircraft were built.
PA-28-180F Cherokee F
1971 model with an improved interior. Two prototypes were converted from Cherokee Es and 234 production aircraft were built.
PA-28-180G Cherokee G
1972 model with an improved instrument panel. Two prototypes were converted from Cherokee Fs and 318 production aircraft were built. The Cherokee G was replaced by the Cherokee Challenger after the 1972 production run.
PA-28-180 Cherokee Challenger
1973 model with the fuselage stretched by five inches, wingspan increased by two feet, and an all-moving tailplane. Other improvements included a new instrument panel and seats as well as a wider door. The Cherokee Challenger retained the Lycoming O-360-A3A engine of its predecessor. Certified with a gross weight of 2,450 lb (1,111 kg) on May 22, 1972. A total of 603 were built; two prototypes (built in 1971 and 1972) and 601 production aircraft. This figure include a number of kits provided to Chincul in Argentina for completion.
PA-28-180 Cherokee Archer
Improved Challenger with new window lines, improved nose wheel steering, and a Lycoming O-360-A4A engine. A total of 540 were built; 280 (1974) and 260 (1975). These production figures include a number of kits provided to Aero Mercantil in Colombia and Chincul in Argentina for completion.
PA-28-140 Cherokee
A stripped-down version of the PA-28-150 originally intended to be a two-place trainer to be used for Piper dealers to conduct introductory flights. The PA-28-140 was certified on February 14, 1964 with a gross weight of 1,950 lb (885 kg). A four-place version with a gross weight of 2,150 lb (975 kg) was certified on June 17, 1965. Built in the following variants:
- PA-26-140 Cherokee, initial two-place trainer version powered by a 150 hp (112 kW) Lycoming O-320-A2B engine. A total of 4,946 were built; 1 (1964 prototype), 655 (1964 production), 731 (1965), 1,193 (1966), 1,533 (1967), 833 (1968). These production figures include a number of kits provided to Aero Mercantil in Colombia for completion. In 1968, a single 1966 aircraft was modified as a prototype for a variant powered by a 115 hp (86 kW) Lycoming engine, but no production followed.
- PA-28-140-4 Cherokee, designation of the PA-28-140 when configured with four seats and powered by a 150 hp (112 kW) Lycoming O-320-A2A engine. The aircraft was offered in three trim levels; Custom, Executive, and Sportsman. Introduced in 1965.
- PA-28-140B Cherokee B, 1969 model with new engine mount and instrument panel as well as minor detail changes. Two prototypes were converted from 1964 and 1968 PA-28-140s and 1,331 production aircraft were built.
- PA-28-140C Cherokee C, 1970 model with minor cosmetic changes and an improved interior and instrument panel. Two prototypes were converted from PA-28-140Bs and 546 production aircraft were built.
- PA-28-140D Cherokee D, 1971 model with new cabin heat system and minor changes. Two prototypes were converted from PA-28-140Cs and 641 production aircraft were built, including Flite Liners.
- PA-28-140E Cherokee E, 1972 model with minor cosmetic changes. Only the Custom and Executive trims were offered for this variant. Two prototypes were converted from PA-28-140Ds and 602 production aircraft were built, including Flite Liners and Cruisers. This figure include a number of kits provided to Chincul in Argentina for completion.
- PA-28-140F Cherokee F, 1973 model with tail fillet, a new instrument panel and front seats, interior padding, and minor cosmetic changes. Air conditioning was added as an option on this variant. Two prototypes were converted from PA-28-140Es and 674 production aircraft were built, including Flite Liners and Cruisers. This figure include a number of kits provided to Chincul in Argentina for completion. The basic PA-28-140 Cherokee was discontinued after 1973.
- PA-28-140 Flite Liner (alternatively Fliteliner), two-seat trainer variant of the PA-28-140D/E/F with full instrumentation and a Lycoming O-320-E2D engine. Production continued after the PA-28-140F was discontinued, with the Flite Liner being produced alongside the Cruiser until 1975.
- PA-28-140 Cruiser 2+2, PA-28-140E/F with a four-seat interior and a Lycoming O-320-E2D engine. Renamed to Cruiser in 1974, production continued after the PA-28-140F was discontinued, with a total of 784 Cruisers and Flite Liners produced in 1974 and 1975 (444 and 340, respectively) and 565 Cruisers in 1976 and 1977 (275 and 290, respectively). These production figures include a number of kits provided to Aero Mercantil in Colombia and Chincul in Argentina for completion.
PA-28-235 Cherokee
Based on the PA-28-180 but with an increased wingspan with enlarged fuel tanks and powered by a 235 hp (175 kW) Lycoming O-540 engine. The PA-28-235 was certified with a gross weight of 2,900 lb (1,315 kg) on July 15, 1963. Built in the following variants:
- PA-28-235 Cherokee, initial version. The second Cherokee prototype was converted to the prototype of this variant in 1962 by fitting a Lycoming O-540-B2B5 engine. Not including the prototype, a total of 719 aircraft were built; 584 (1964) and 135 (1965). One PA-28-235 was fitted with a 220 hp (164 kW) Franklin engine for testing purposes in 1965.
- PA-28-235B Cherokee B, improved model with minor detail changes, including a lengthened spinner and an improved fuel system. The aircraft was fitted with a fixed-pitch propeller as standard, but optional constant-speed propeller was also available. Two prototypes were converted from PA-28-235s, followed by a production run of 320 aircraft; 121 (1966) and 199 (1967).
- PA-28-235C Cherokee C, improved model with a third window on each side, a new engine control console, and a redesigned interior. A total of 216 were built; 187 (1968) and 29 (1969). These production figures include a number of kits provided to Aero Mercantil in Colombia for completion.
- PA-28-235D Cherokee D, 1970 model with minor cosmetic changes. Two prototypes were converted from PA-28-235Cs and 78 production aircraft were built. This figure include a number of kits provided to Aero Mercantil in Colombia for completion.
- PA-28-235E Cherokee E, 1971 model with rear bench seat replaced by separate seats and improved soundproofing. Air conditioning was added as an option on this variant. A single prototype was converted from a PA-28-235D and 28 production aircraft were built.
- PA-28-235F Cherokee F, 1972 model with tail fillet, a new instrument panel, and other minor changes. A single prototype was converted from an older model and 23 production aircraft were built.
- PA-28-235 Cherokee Charger, 1973 model with a five-inch fuselage stretch, an enlarged all-moving tailplane, new seats, a padded instrument panel, a wider door, and powered by a Lycoming O-540-B4B5 engine. This variant was certified with a gross weight of 3,000 lb (1,361 kg) on June 9, 1972. A total of 177 were built; 1 prototype and 176 production aircraft. This figure include a number of kits provided to Aero Mercantil in Colombia and Chincul in Argentina for completion.
- PA-28-235 Cherokee Pathfinder, introduced in 1974 with improved nose wheel steering and restyled window lines. In 1975, Piper added seats with vertical adjustment and optional cabin soundproofing. A total of were built; 110 (1974), 135 (1975), 202 (1976), and 89 (1977). These production figures include a number of kits provided to Embraer in Brazil, Aero Mercantil in Colombia, and Chincul in Argentina for completion.
Cherokee Chief 180TG
Modification of a Cherokee with new wingtips and conventional landing gear. At least one aircraft was converted from a 1965 Cherokee C.

=== Tapered-wing PA-28 ===
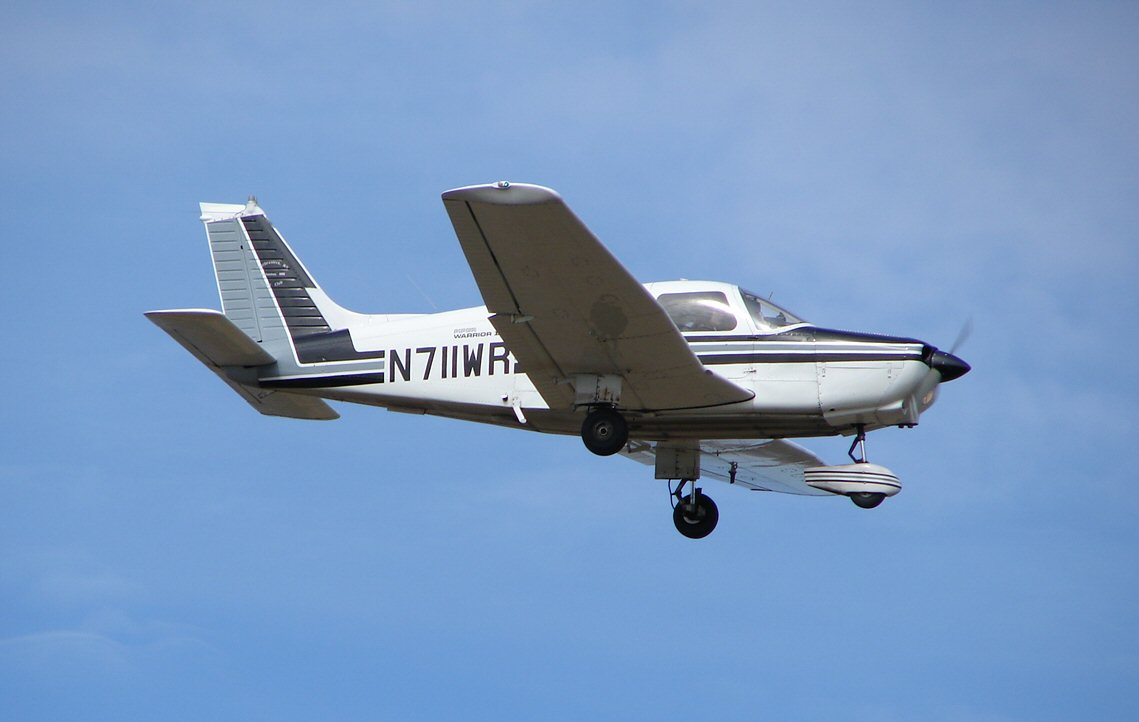
Later PA-28 aircraft, such as this PA-28-161 Cherokee Warrior II, feature a tapered wing.

In 1972, Piper began development of a wing for the PA-28 with an increased wingspan, tapered outer-wing panels, and larger ailerons. These changes were intended to improve low-speed and cross-wind handling. This new wing was tested on the first Cherokee Challenger prototype before being introduced on production aircraft with the PA-28-151 Cherokee Warrior.

PA-28-151 Cherokee Warrior
Based on the PA-28-180 Cherokee Challenger but with the new tapered wing, a 150 hp (112 kW) engine mounted in a streamlined cowling, and a smaller nose wheel. The prototype was converted from the first Challenger prototype and was powered by a Lycoming O-320-E2D engine, while production aircraft were fitted with the Lycoming O-320-E3D. The PA-28-151 was certified with a gross weight of 2,325 lb (1,055 kg) on August 9, 1973. The aircraft was originally announced as the Cherokee Lance before being renamed to Warrior, with the "Cherokee Lance" name subsequently going to the Piper PA-32R. Production began in 1974 and each model year brought improvements; 1975 had seats with vertical adjustment and optional cabin soundproofing, 1976 had new wheel fairings, and 1977 introduced improved ventilation, a new instrument panel, and a new door latch. Aside from the prototype, a total of 1,900 were built; 703 (1974), 449 (1975), 434 (1976), and 314 (1977). (Note: One 1975 Cherokee Warrior was converted into the prototype of the 1976 model year and assigned a new serial number. This conversion is not counted in the 1976 production figure.)
PA-28-161 Cherokee Warrior II
Based on the PA-28-151 but with a 160 hp (119 kW) Lycoming O-320-D3G engine. The aircraft was certified with a gross weight of 2,325 lb (1,055 kg) on November 2, 1976, and later with a gross weight of 2,440 lb (1,107 kg) on July 1, 1982. The increased gross weight was introduced on the 1983 model year. Beginning with the 1979 model year, the "Cherokee" name was dropped, with the aircraft being marketed as simply the Warrior II. Aside from a single prototype converted from a PA-28-151, a total of 2,932 had been built by 1987, with production ongoing as of that year; 322 (1977), 680 (1978), 598 (1979), 373 (1980), 322 (1981), 218 (1982), 112 (1983), 131 (1984), 97 (1985), 79 (1986/87). (Note: Eight 1961 aircraft were converted to the 1962 model year and two 1964 aircraft were converted to the 1965 model year. Piper introduced a new serialization system partway though 1986, with five existing aircraft being reserialized under the new system. These conversions and reserializations are only counted in their original model year's production figures.) These production figures include a number of kits provided to Aero Mercantil in Colombia, Aero Salfa in Chile, and Chincul in Argentina for completion.
PA-28-161 Cadet
Stripped-down trainer variant of the Warrior II introduced in 1988 to replace the PA-38 Tomahawk.
PA-28-161 Warrior III
Improved Warrior II certified with a gross weight of 2,440 lb (1,107 kg) on July 1, 1994.
PA-28-181 Cherokee Archer II
Based on the PA-28-180 Cherokee Archer but with a structurally-reinforced version of the Cherokee Warrior's tapered wing and powered by a Lycoming O-360-A4M engine. Certified with a gross weight of 2,550 lb (1,157 kg) on July 8, 1975. Several changes were implemented along the production line, including a new panel, door latch, seats, ventilation in 1977, enlarged landing gear fairings in 1979, and quick-change wheel fairings and a new interior in 1980. Beginning with the 1979 model year, "Cherokee" was dropped from the name and all subsequent aircraft were marketed as the Archer II. A single prototype was converted from a 1975 Cherokee Archer, and a total of 3,451 production aircraft had been built by 1987, with production ongoing as of that year; 466 (1976), 607 (1977), 551 (1978), 589 (1979), 372 (1980), 315 (1981), 168 (1982), 81 (1983), 112 (1984), 92 (1985), and 98 (1986/87). (Note: Ten 1981 aircraft was converted to the 1982 model year and nine 1982 aircraft were converted to the 1983 model year. Piper introduced a new serialization system partway though 1986, with four existing aircraft being reserialized under the new system. In addition, three 1981 serial number was assigned to aircraft that were not built. These conversions and reserializations are only counted in their original model year's production figures.) These production figures include a number of kits provided to Embraer in Brazil, Aero Mercantil in Colombia, and Aero Salfa in Chile, and Chincul in Argentina for completion.
PA-28-181 Archer III
Improved Archer II with a redesigned engine cowling, squared side windows, a new instrument panel, and a 28 volt electrical system. Certified with a gross weight of 2,550 lb (1,157 kg) on August 30, 1994.

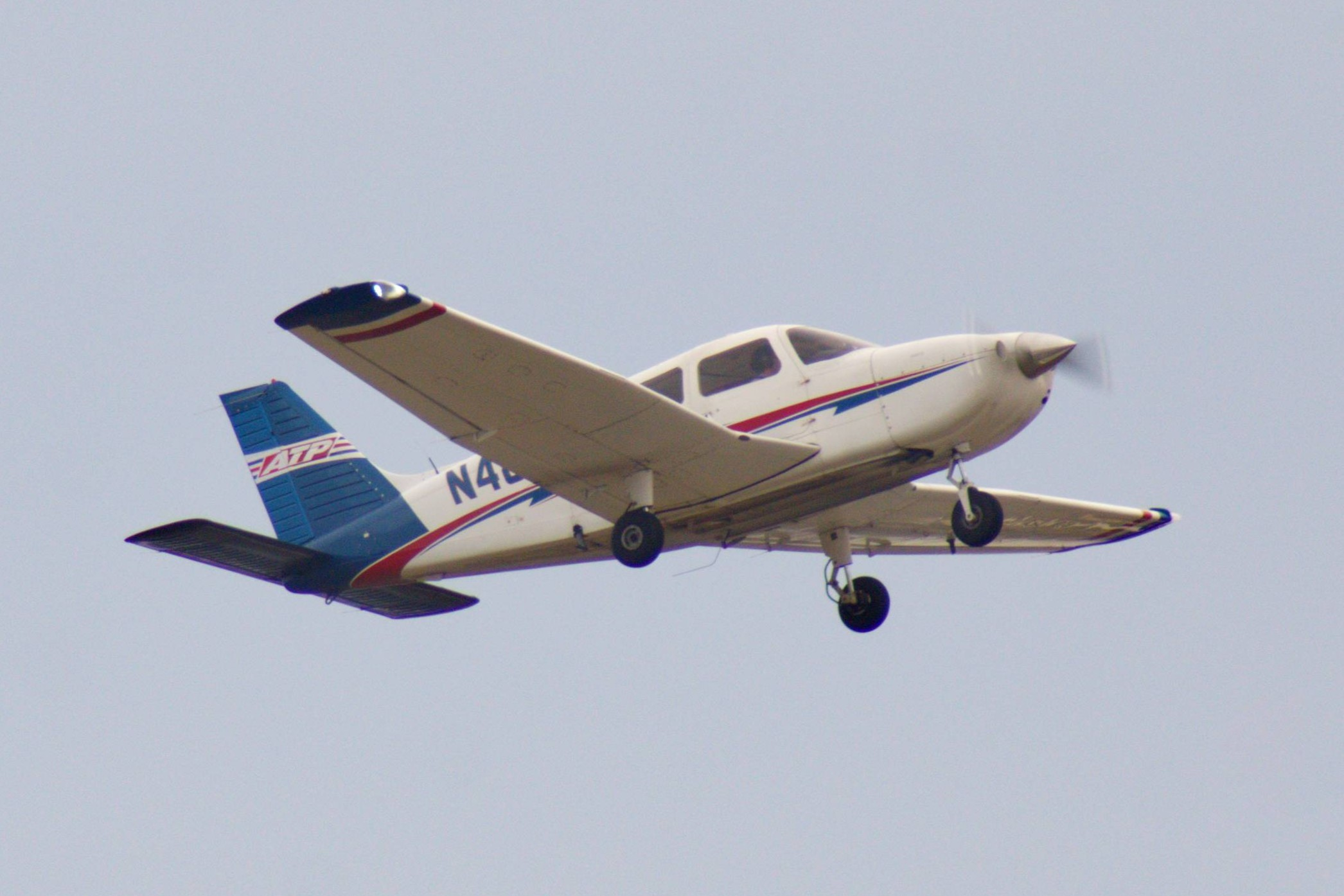
PA-28-181 Archer TX

PA-28-181 Archer TX and LX
Improved model powered by a Lycoming O-360-B4A engine with maximum takeoff weight 2,550 lb (1,157 kg). As of 2026 it is produced in Archer TX trainer and Archer LX personal aircraft variants, both with Garmin G1000 NXi avionics.

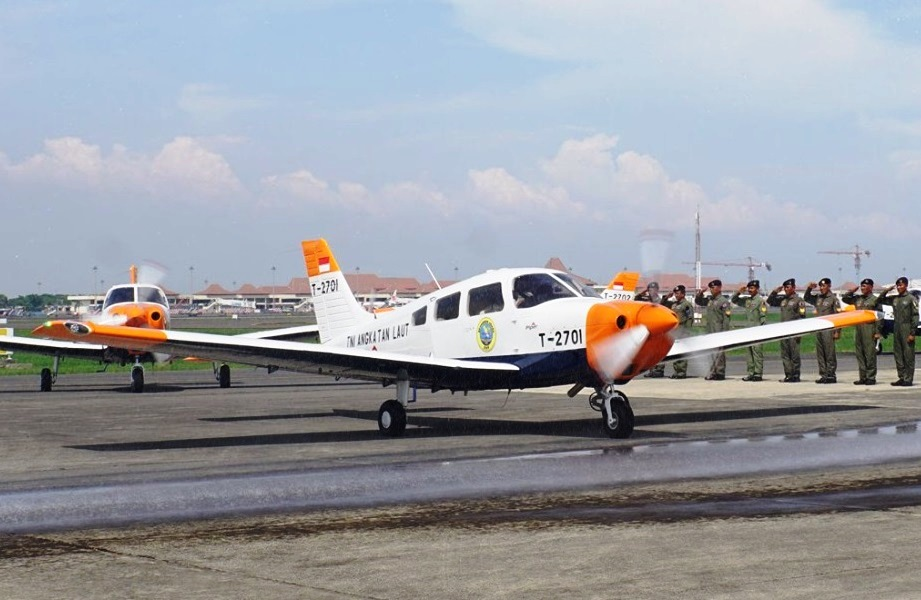
PA-28-181 Archer DX of the Indonesian Navy

PA-28-181 Archer DX and DLX
Four-place, fixed landing gear landplane, turbocharged Continental CD-155 diesel engine of 155 hp (116 kW). Introduced at AERO Friedrichshafen in April 2014. The compression-ignition engine is simpler to operate, avoiding starting difficulties, carburetor icing or propeller and mixture controls, and the liquid cooling does not suffer shock cooling in a rapid descent. The turbocharger maintains full power up to over 10,000 ft (3,000 m) to climbs at 700 to 500 ft/min (3.6 to 2.5 m/s) at 86 kn (159 km/h), and cruise fuel flow is 4.2 to 6.3 US gal (16 to 24 L; 3.5 to 5.2 imp gal)/h at 50 to 75% power and a 100 to 117 kn (185 to 217 km/h) IAS. The engine must be replaced every 2,100 hours. Produced in Archer DX trainer and Archer DLX personal aircraft variants as of 2026.
PA-28-181 Pilot 100 and Pilot 100i
New versions introduced in 2019 intended as low cost VFR and IFR trainers respectively, for the flight training market. Fixed landing gear, 180 hp Lycoming IO-360-B4A, Garmin G3X Touch Certified avionics. IFR version includes GFC500 autopilot. Features the 2-side-window fuselage with the later tapered wing, no baggage door, no air conditioning, no instruments on right-hand panel, all-white paint with decals, two-place seating standard on 100, rear third seat with push-to-talk and Bluetooth functions standard on 100i and optional on 100. These new versions were type certified in the US in December 2020 and in Europe in August 2021. The Pilot 100i is still in production as of 2026.

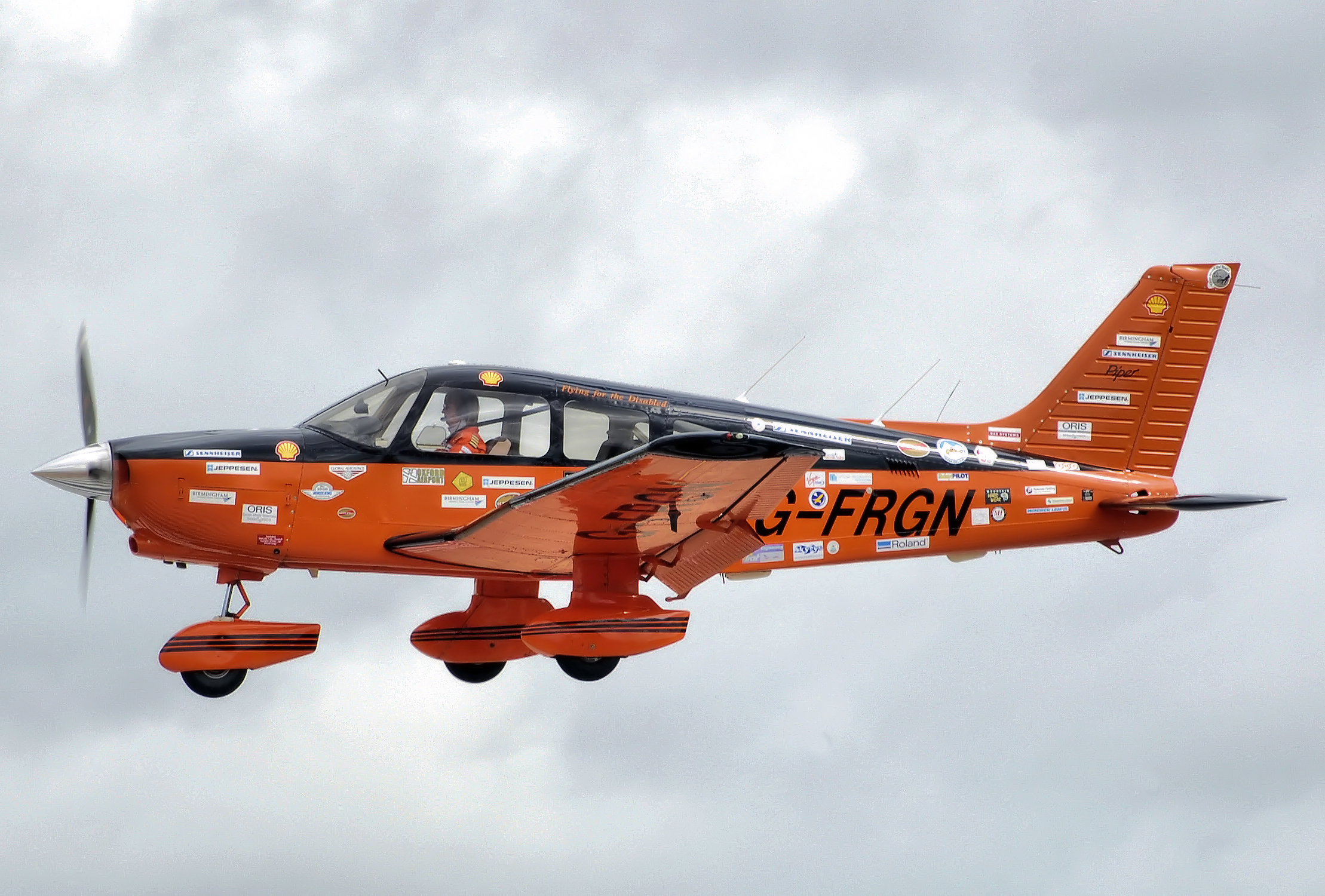
Polly Vacher, a record-breaking UK pilot, in her PA-28-236 Dakota

PA-28-236 Dakota
Developed from the Cherokee Pathfinder but with the tapered wing of the Warrior II and powered by a Lycoming O-540-J3A5D engine. Certified with a gross weight of 3,000 lb (1,361 kg) on June 1, 1978. A single prototype was converted from a 1977 Cherokee Pathfinder, and a total of 725 production aircraft had been built by 1987, with production ongoing as of that year; 334 (1979), 151 (1980), 96 (1981), 49 (1982), 21 (1983), 30 (1984), 20 (1985), 12 (1986), and 12 (1987). (Note: One 1981 aircraft was converted to the 1982 model year, five 1982 aircraft were converted to the 1983 model year, and one 1983 aircraft was converted to the 1984 model year. Piper introduced a new serialization system partway though 1986, with one existing aircraft being reserialized under the new system. In addition, one 1981 serial number was assigned to an aircraft that was not built. These conversions and reserializations are only counted in their original model year's production figures.) These production figures include a number of kits provided to Embraer in Brazil, Aero Mercantil in Colombia, ENAER in Chile, and Chincul in Argentina for completion.
PA-28-201T Turbo Dakota
Developed in parallel with the Dakota, the Turbo Dakota was powered by a turbocharged 200 hp (149 kW) Continental TSIO-360-FB engine and combined the fuselage of the Archer II with the wing of the Dakota. Certified with a gross weight of 2,900 lb (1,315 kg) on December 14, 1978. A single prototype was converted from a 1977 Archer II, and a production run of 90 aircraft were built in 1979. (Note: A total of 94 serial numbers were assigned for the Turbo Dakota production run, though the last four aircraft were not built.) This figure include one kit provided to Aero Mercantil in Colombia for completion.

=== PA-28R Arrow ===
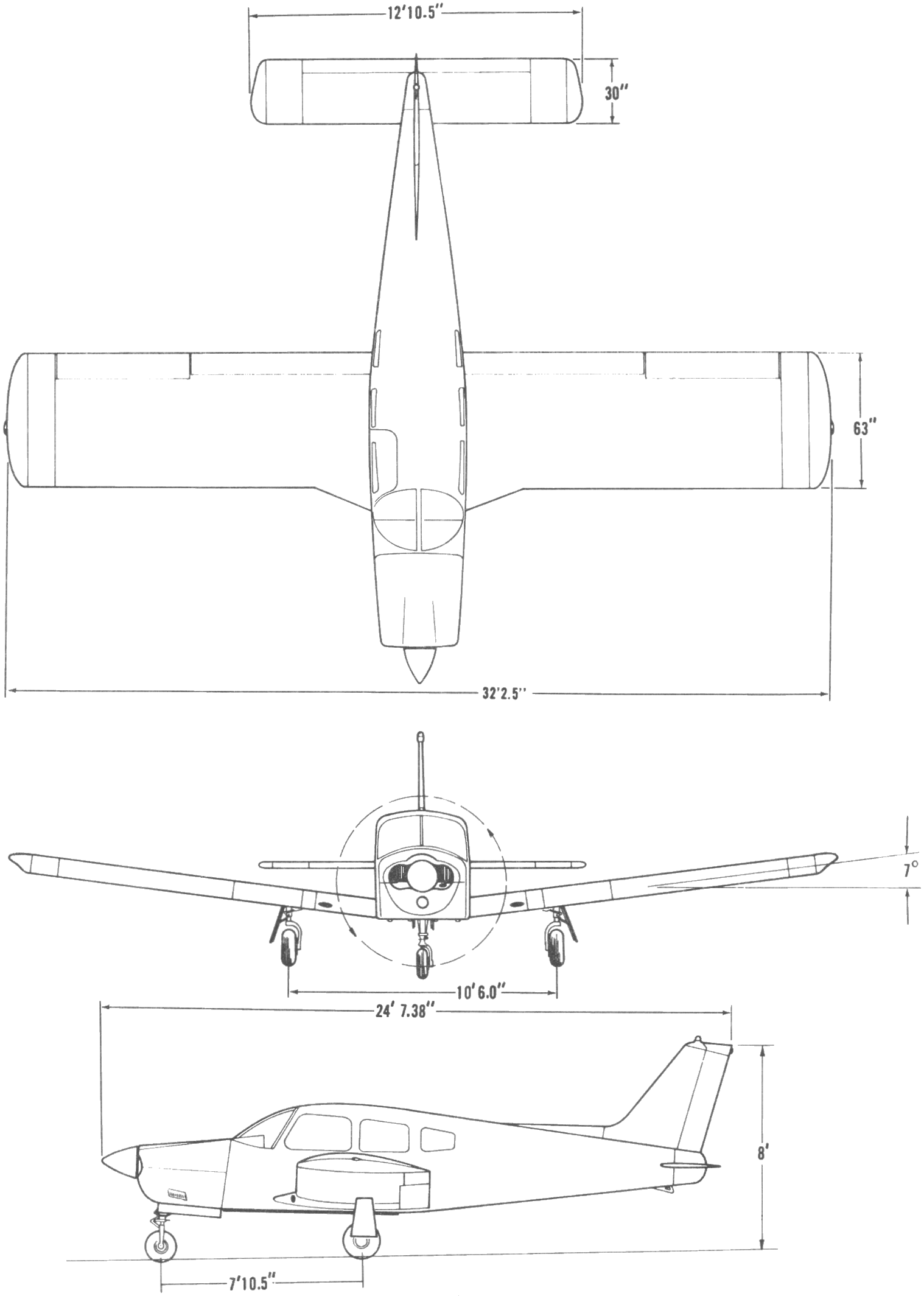
A 3-view drawing of a Piper PA-28R-200 Cherokee Arrow

PA-28R Cherokee Arrow
Based on the PA-28-180 Cherokee but with retractable landing gear, a constant-speed propeller, and a third window on each side of the fuselage. Built in the following variants:
- PA-28R-180 Cherokee Arrow, powered by a 180 hp (134 kW) Lycoming IO-360-A2A engine. Certified with a gross weight of 2,500 lb (1,134 kg) on June 8, 1967. A total of 1,135 were built; 3 (1966 ptototypes), 348 (1967), 736 (1968), and 48 (1969). These production figures include one kit provided to Aero Mercantil in Colombia for completion.
- PA-28R-200 Cherokee Arrow, powered by a 200 hp (149 kW) Lycoming IO-360-C1C engine. Certified with a gross weight of 2,600 lb (1,179 kg) on January 16, 1969. A single prototype was converted from a 1968 PA-28R-180, followed by a production run of 392 aircraft in 1969.
PA-28R Cherokee Arrow B
Successor to the original Cherokee Arrow with minor improvements. A single prototype was converted from a 1968 PA-28R-180. Built in the following variants:
- PA-28R-180B Cherokee Arrow B, 180 hp (134 kW) variant. Not including the prototype, a total of 33 were built; 20 (1970) and 13 (1971).
- PA-28R-200B Cherokee Arrow B, 200 hp (149 kW) variant. Autopilot added as an option on this variant. A total of 449 were built; 220 (1970) and 229 (1971).
PA-28R-200 Cherokee Arrow II
Based on the Cherokee Arrow B but with the fuselage lengthened by five inches and only offered with the 200 hp (149 kW) Lycoming IO-360-C1C engine. Other changes include an enlarged, all-moving tailplane, a wider door, an increased wingspan with fiberglass wingtips, a redesigned interior, and optional air conditioning. Certified with a gross weight of 2,650 lb (1,202 kg) on December 2, 1971. Several changes were implemented along the production line, including a padded instrument panel and new seats in 1973, rounded window lines in 1974, vertically-adjustable seats and optional soundproofing in 1975, and increased engine time before overhaul in 1976. Beginning with the 1975 model year, "Cherokee" was dropped from the name and all subsequent aircraft were marketed as the Arrow II. A single prototype was converted from a 1970 Cherokee Arrow B, followed by a total of 2,017 production aircraft; 320 (1972), 446 (1973), 323 (1974), 383 (1975), and 545 (1976). These production figures include a number of kits provided to Embraer in Brazil, Aero Mercantil in Colombia, and Chincul in Argentina for completion.
PA-28RT-201 Arrow III
Based on the Arrow II but with a tapered wing similar to that of the Warrior, a T-tail, and an increased fuel capacity. A single prototype was converted from a 1975 Arrow II, but no production aircraft were built in this configuration.
PA-28R-201 Arrow III
Similar to the first Arrow III prototype but reverting to the conventional tail of the Arrow II and powered by a Lycoming IO-360-C1C6 engine. Certified with a gross weight of 2,750 lb (1,247 kg) on November 2, 1976. A single prototype was converted from a 1976 Arrow II, followed by 493 production aircraft; 176 (1977) and 317 (1978). These production figures include a number of kits provided to Embraer in Brazil for completion.
PA-28RT-201T Turbo Arrow III
Similar to the T-tail PA-28RT-201 Arrow III but powered by a turbocharged 200 hp (149 kW) Continental TSIO-360-F engine. A single prototype was converted from a 1976 Arrow II, but no production aircraft were built in this configuration.
PA-28R-201T Turbo Arrow III
Based on the Turbo Arrow III prototype but reverting to the conventional tail. Certified with a gross weight of 2,900 lb (1,315 kg) on November 2, 1976. A total of 799 were built; 426 (1977) and 373 (1978). These production figures include a number of kits provided to Aero Mercantil in Colombia and Chincul in Argentina for completion.

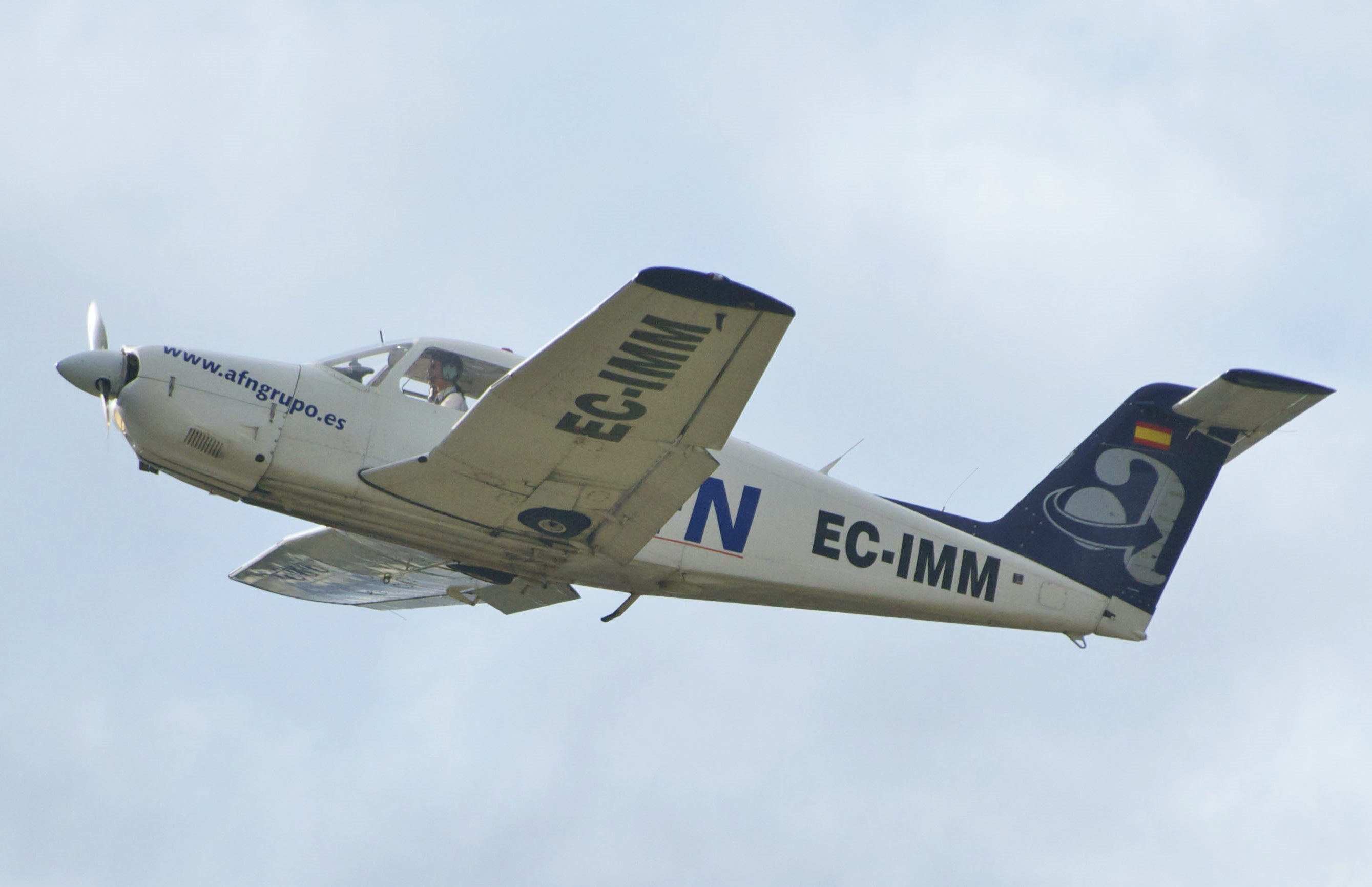
A PA-28RT-201 Arrow IV over A Coruña Airport

PA-28RT-201 Arrow IV
Based on the Arrow III but with a T-tail and a 14-inch fuselage extension. Certified with a gross weight of 2,750 lb (1,247 kg) on November 13, 1978. A single prototype was converted from a 1978 Arrow III, followed by a production run of 479 aircraft; 266 (1979), 106 (1980), 82 (1981), and 25 (1982). (Note: One 1981 aircraft was converted to the 1982 model year. This reserialization is only counted in its original model year's production figure.) These production figures include a number of kits provided to Embraer in Brazil and Chincul in Argentina for completion.
PA-28RT-201T Turbo Arrow IV
Turbocharged version of the Arrow IV powered by a Continental TSIO-360-FB engine. Certified with a gross weight of 2,900 lb (1,315 kg) on November 13, 1978. A single prototype was converted from a 1978 Turbo Arrow III, and a total of 888 aircraft had been produced by 1987, with production ongoing as of that year; 309 (1979), 178 (1980), 208 (1981), 80 (1982), 48 (1983), 32 (1984), 15 (1985), and 18 (1986/87). (Note: Three 1982 aircraft were converted to the 1983 model year. Piper introduced a new serialization system partway though 1986, with one existing aircraft being reserialized under the new system. These conversions and reserializations are only counted in their original model year's production figures.) These production figures include a number of kits provided to Embraer in Brazil, Aero Mercantil in Colombia, and Chincul in Argentina for completion.
PA-28R-221T
Arrow variant with a conventional tail, a one-piece windshield, and powered by a 220 hp (164 kW) Continental TSIO-360-KB2A engine. A single prototype was built, but no production followed.

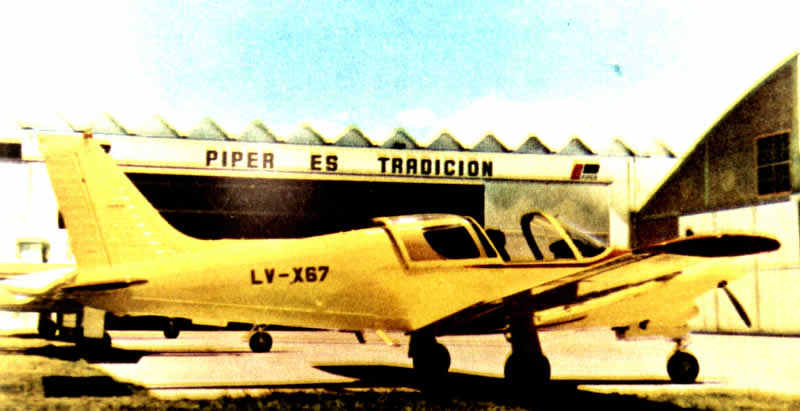
Chincul PA-A-28R-260T Cherokee Arrow III

PA-A-28R-260T Cherokee Arrow III
Prototype armed military variant developed by Chincul in Argentina with a side-by-side two-seat cockpit and a sliding canopy. Powered by a 260 hp (194 kW) Lycoming AEIO-540 engine and armed with a 7.62 mm gun. Intended for service in the Argentine armed forces but not accepted.

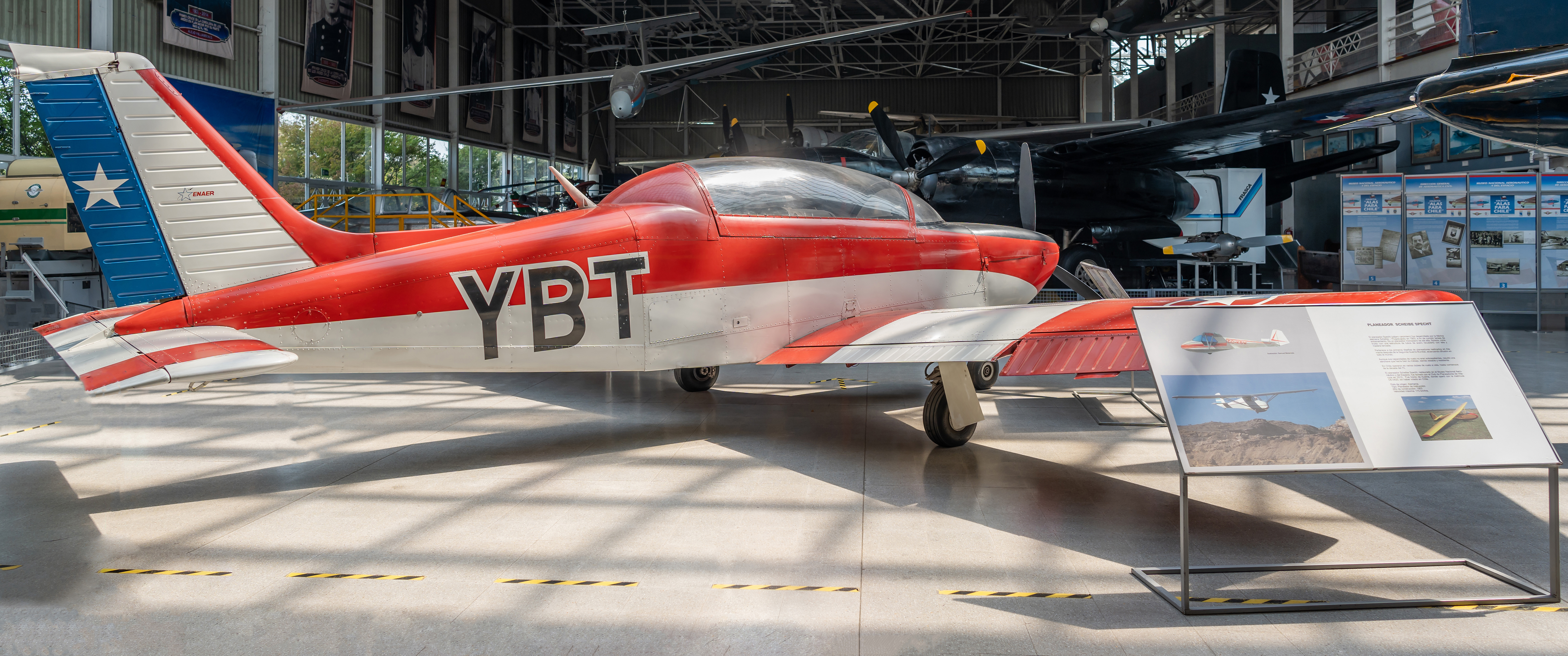
The second PA-28R-300 Pillán, designated YBT, at Museo Nacional Aeronáutico y del Espacio.

PA-28R-300 Pillán
Piper designation of the ENAER T-35 Pillán, a military trainer originally built for the Chilean Air Force with a cut-down PA-32R Saratoga fuselage, a two-seat tandem cockpit, a PA-28R Arrow wing and originally powered by a 300 hp (224 kW) Lycoming IO-540-K1K5 engine. Two prototypes were built in 1981 by Piper, respectively designated XBT and YBT, while production aircraft were sent in kit form to be built by ENAER. By 1987, a total of 120 production kits had been built by Piper, with production ongoing as of that year.

=== Foreign production ===
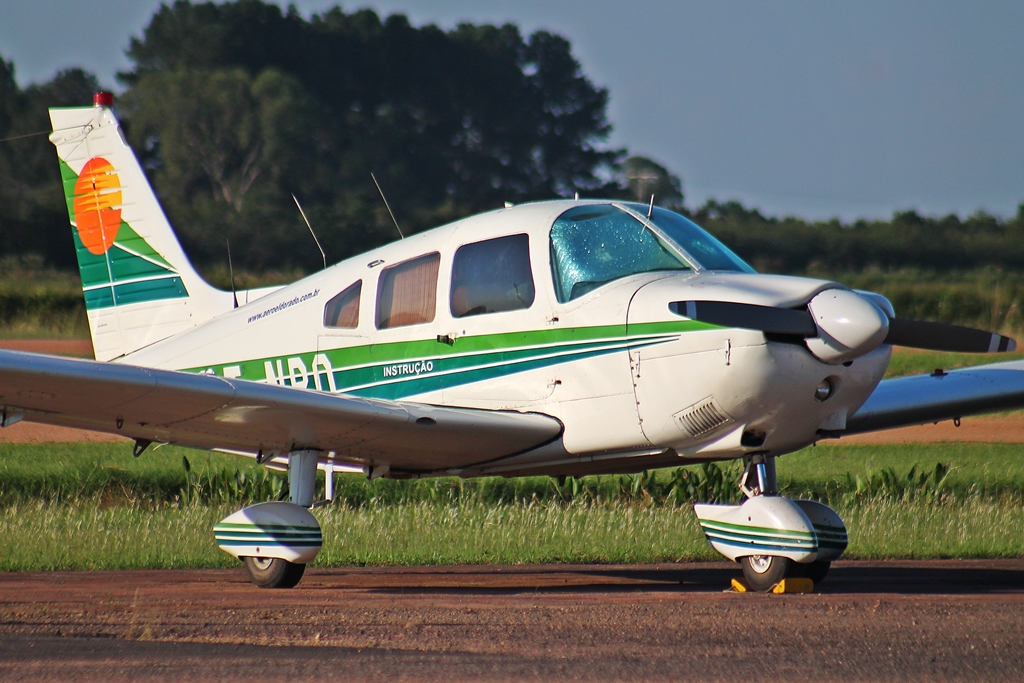
Embraer EMB-712 Tupi

EMB-710C Carioca
PA-28-235 built by Neiva (a subsidiary of Embraer) in Brazil from kits supplied by Piper.
EMB-710D Carioca
PA-28-236 built by Neiva in Brazil from kits supplied by Piper.
EMB-711B Corisco
PA-28R-201 Arrow III built by Neiva in Brazil from kits supplied by Piper.
EMB-711C Corisco
PA-28R-200 Arrow II built by Neiva in Brazil from kits supplied by Piper.
EMB-711S Corisco II
PA-28RT-201 Arrow IV built by Neiva in Brazil from kits supplied by Piper.
EMB-711ST Corisco II
PA-28RT-201T Turbo Arrow IV built by Neiva in Brazil from kits supplied by Piper. Also known as the Corisco Turbo.
EMB-712 Tupi
PA-28-180 built by Neiva in Brazil from kits supplied by Piper. Also known as the Carioquinha.
PA-A-28
Designation applied to PA-28s built by Chincul in Argentina from kits supplied by Piper.

== Operators ==
The Cherokee series has been popular with private owners and flying clubs, with over 32,000 delivered.

=== Military operators ===
Angola

- FAPA/DAA

Argentina

- Argentine Coast Guard

Chile

- Chilean Air Force

Honduras

- Honduran Air Force

Indonesia

- Indonesian Navy

Qatar

- Qatar Emiri Air Force

=== Retired ===
Colombia

- Colombian Navy – Retired.

Finland

- Finnish Air Force – 14 x Cherokee Arrow 200. Retired 2005.

== Notable accidents and incidents ==
- September 9, 1969, Allegheny Airlines Flight 853, a Douglas DC-9-31, collided with a Piper PA-28R-180 Cruiser over Fairland, Indiana, killing all aboard both planes.
- August 28, 1972, Prince William of Gloucester was killed along with the copilot of his Piper Cherokee Arrow, which crashed shortly after takeoff from Halfpenny Green in Staffordshire, England, in an air race.
- March 23, 1976, Mitsuyasu Maeno attempted to assassinate right-wing nationalist Yoshio Kodama by flying a Piper PA-28 into Kodama's house. Maeno died in the crash, but Kodama was unharmed.
- November 16, 1984, a private PA-28 on a flight from Farmingdale Airport, crashed off the Atlantic City coastline, killing all four occupants.
- August 31, 1986, Aeroméxico Flight 498, a Douglas DC-9-32, collided with a Piper PA-28-181 Archer, owned by William Kramer, over Cerritos, California, killing all 67 people aboard both planes and 15 people on the ground. It was the worst air disaster in the history of Los Angeles, and resulted in regulatory changes requiring all airliners to be equipped with a traffic collision avoidance system (TCAS) and all light aircraft operating in terminal control areas to be equipped with a mode C transponder.
- November 21, 1993, skydiver Alan Peters collided with the vertical stabilizer of a PA-28 while in freefall, after jumping from another aircraft. All four people aboard the PA-28 were killed after the plane lost control and crashed into a nearby forest. Peters was able to successfully open his parachute after the collision and survived, sustaining a fractured leg.
- November 26, 1993, Piper PA-28-181 Archer was involved in a mid-air collision with an Aerospatiale TwinStar helicopter in Auckland, New Zealand, killing the sole occupant of the Piper and all 3 occupants of the helicopter.
- February 18, 2010, Andrew Joseph Stack III deliberately flew his Piper PA-28-236 Dakota into Building 1 of the Echelon office complex in Austin, Texas, in an apparent revenge attack on the Internal Revenue Service office located there, Stack, the aircraft's sole occupant, was killed along with one person in the building, the IRS manager Vernon Hunter.
- November 17, 2011, a PA-28-180 crash four miles south of Perryville, Arkansas, claimed the life of Oklahoma State University head women's basketball coach Kurt Budke and assistant coach Miranda Serna, along with the pilot former Oklahoma State senator Olin Branstetter and another passenger.
- On April 4, 2018, an Embry-Riddle student and his FAA examiner were killed when the left wing of their PA-28 (N106ER) separated as they flew west of Daytona Beach International Airport. The wing failed due to metal fatigue in the wing spar. An ERAU spokesman subsequently said that the university had stopped flying the PA-28.
- On May 27, 2019, Brazilian singer Gabriel Diniz was killed in the crash of a Piper PA-28-180 Cherokee Archer in Estância, Brazil.
- On August 25, 2019, award-winning music composer Jonathan Goldstein, his musician wife Hannah and their baby daughter were killed in the crash of a Piper PA-28 Arrow. They were flying from Switzerland to Italy when their aircraft crashed above the pass near the Italian border.

== Specifications (1964 model PA-28-140 Cherokee 140) ==
3-view line drawing of the Piper Cherokee

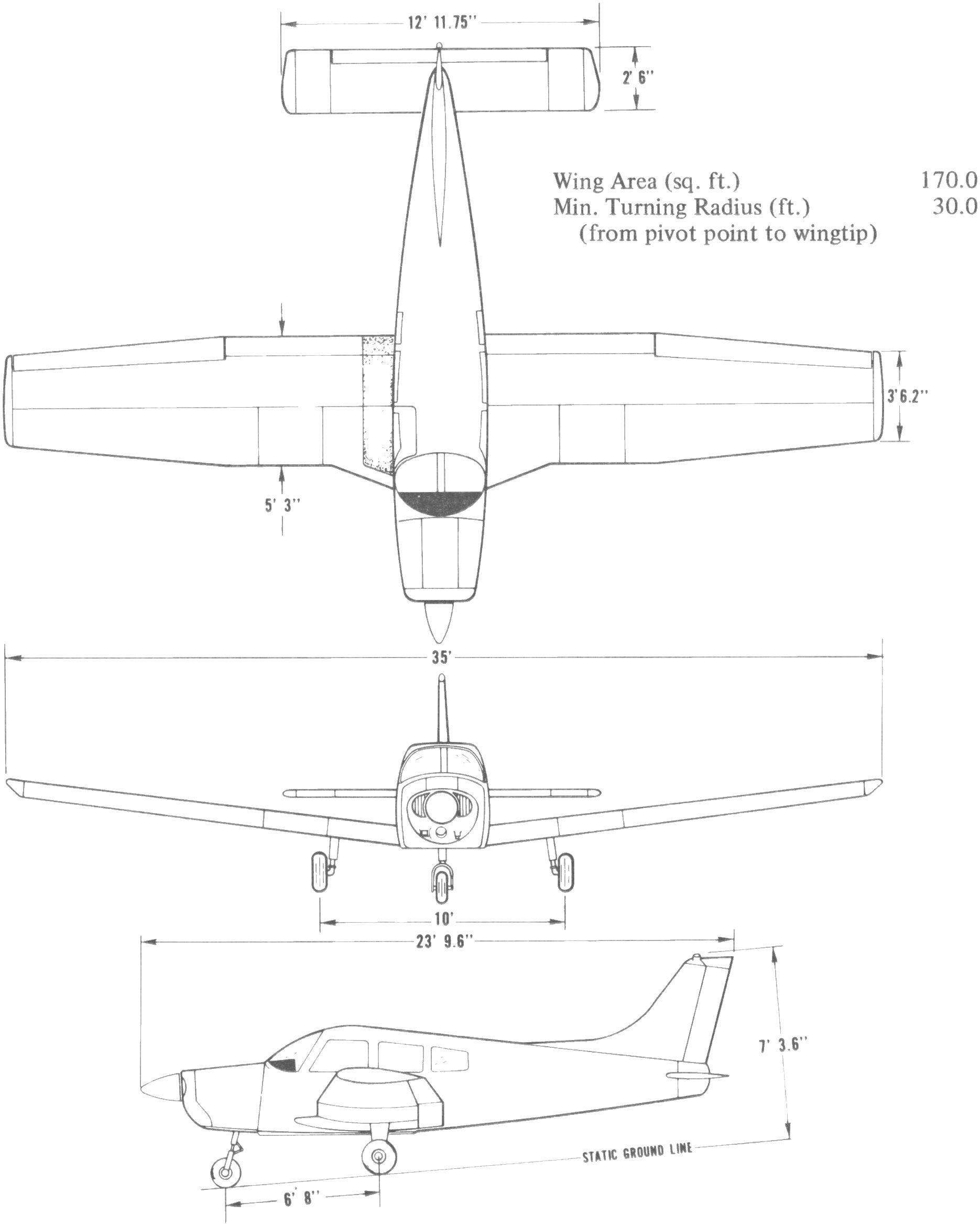
3-view line drawing of the Piper PA-28-161 Cherokee Warrior II

Data from Piper Aircraft Owner's Handbook

General characteristics

- Crew: one
- Capacity: three passengers
- Length: 23 ft 3.6 in (7.102 m)
- Wingspan: 30 ft 0 in (9.14 m)
- Height: 7 ft 3.6 in (2.225 m)
- Wing area: 160 sq ft (15 m^{2})
- Airfoil: NACA 65_{2}-415
- Empty weight: 1,201 lb (545 kg)
- Gross weight: 2,150 lb (975 kg)
- Max takeoff weight: 2,150 lb (975 kg)
- Powerplant: 1 × Lycoming O-320-E2A 4-cylinder air-cooled horizontally-opposed piston engine, 150 hp (110 kW)
- Propellers: Sensenich M74DM

Performance

- Maximum speed: 123 kn (142 mph, 228 km/h)
- Cruise speed: 108 kn (124 mph, 200 km/h)
- Stall speed: 47 kn (54 mph, 87 km/h)
- Range: 465 nmi (535 mi, 861 km)
- Service ceiling: 14,300 ft (4,400 m)
- Rate of climb: 660 ft/min (3.4 m/s)
- Wing loading: 13.4 lb/sq ft (65 kg/m^{2})
- Power/mass: 0.0699 hp/lb (0.1149 kW/kg)

== See also ==
Related development

- Piper PA-32
- Piper PA-44 Seminole

Aircraft of comparable role, configuration, and era

- Beagle Pup
- Beechcraft Musketeer
- Cessna 172
- Cessna 177 Cardinal
- Cessna 182 Skylane
- Diamond DA40
- Grumman AA-5 Traveller, Cheetah and Tiger
- Robin DR400
- SIAI-Marchetti S.205
- SOCATA Horizon
- SOCATA TB family
- Wassmer WA-51 Pacific

Related lists

- List of civil aircraft
- List of most-produced aircraft
