= Piper PA-32 Cherokee Six =

Family of light single engine aircraft

PA-32 Cherokee Six
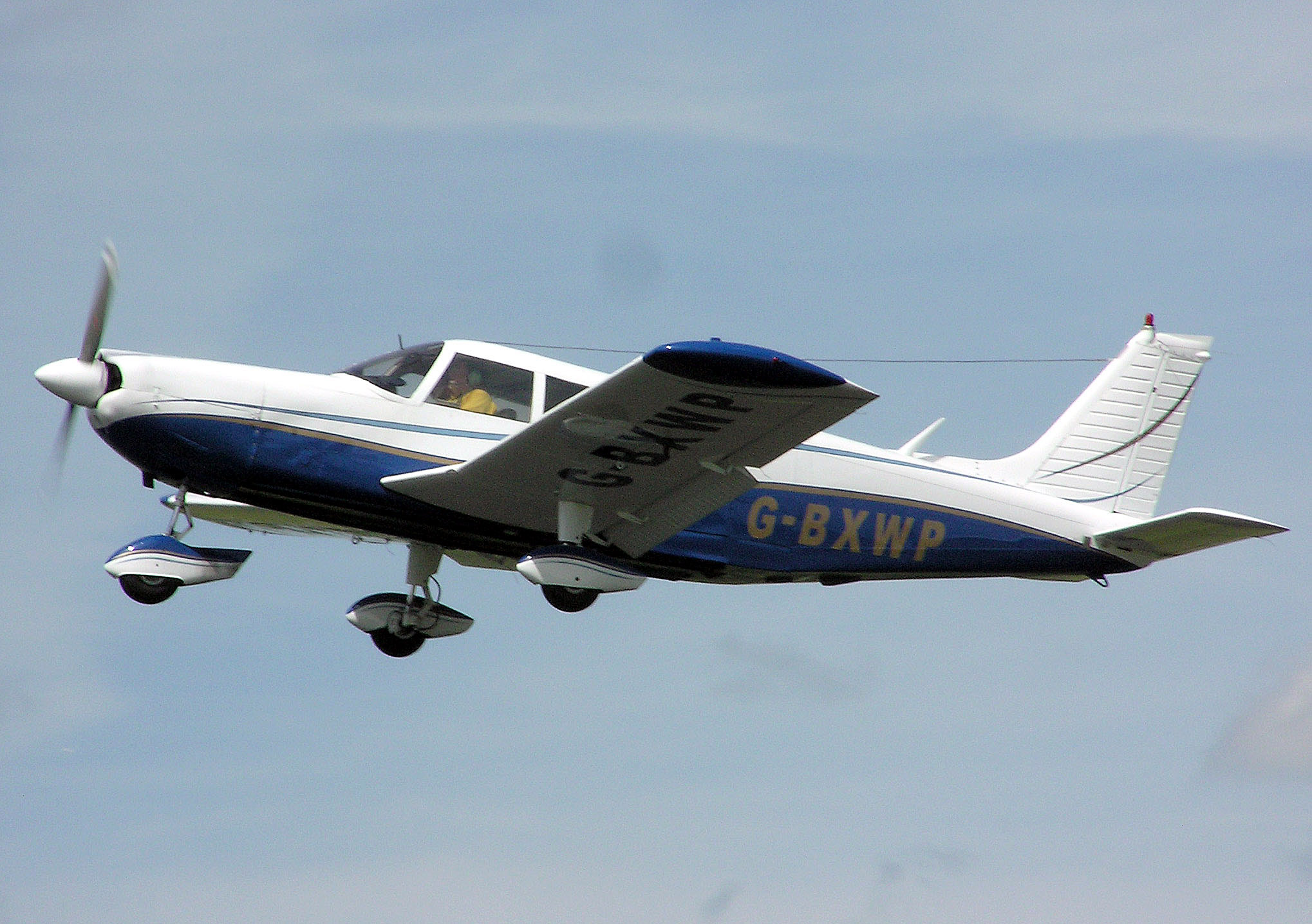
- 1973 model Piper PA-32-300 Cherokee Six

General information
- Type: personal use and air taxi aircraft
- Manufacturer: Piper Aircraft
- Status: Production complete; in service
- Number built: 7,842+

History
- Manufactured: 1965-2007
- Introduction date: 1965
- First flight: December 6, 1963
- Developed from: Piper PA-28 Cherokee
- Developed into: Piper PA-32R; Piper PA-34 Seneca

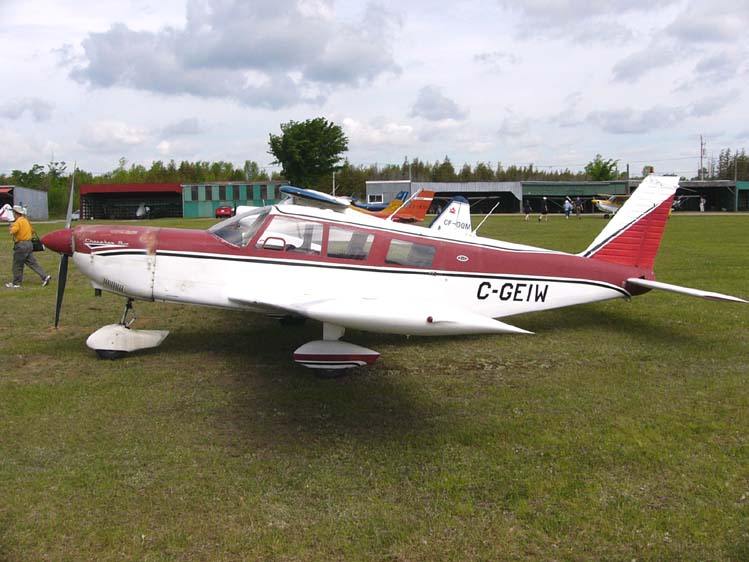
A 1966 model Piper PA-32-260 Cherokee Six

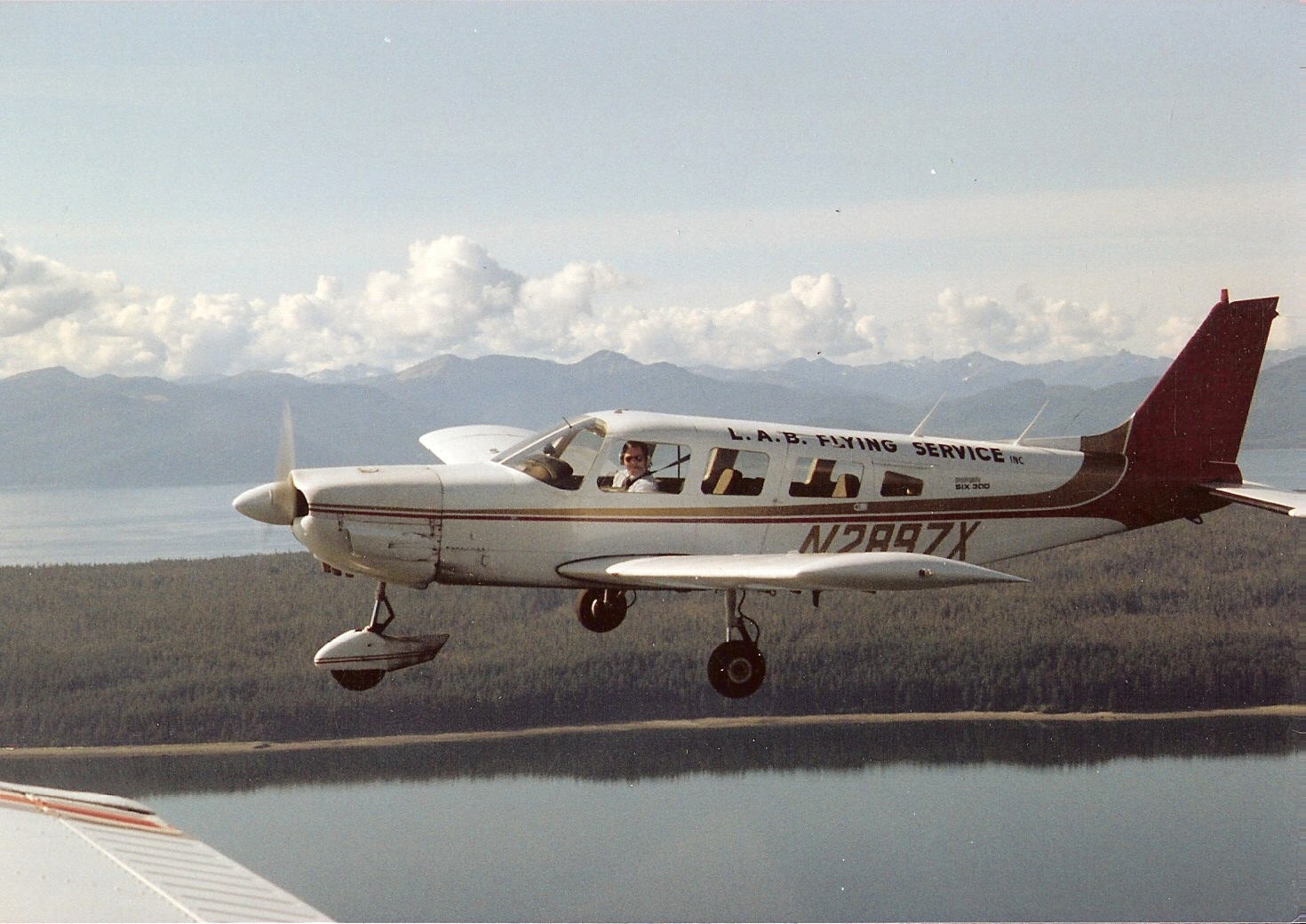
Piper PA-32-300

The Piper PA-32 Cherokee Six is a series of single-engine, fixed landing gear, light aircraft manufactured in the United States by Piper Aircraft between 1965 and 2007.

The PA-32 is used around the world for private transportation, air taxi services, bush support, and medevac flights.

== Development ==
The PA-32 series was developed to meet a requirement for a larger aircraft than the four-seat Piper PA-28 Cherokee. The first prototype PA-32 made its initial flight on December 6, 1963, with the type being publicly announced in October 1964, with Federal Aviation Administration (FAA) aircraft type certification following on March 4, 1965. The first production aircraft was the 260 horsepower (190 kW) PA-32-260 Cherokee Six, a significantly modified six-seat (or seven-seat) development of the PA-28 Cherokee.

The Cherokee Six and its successors feature a baggage compartment in the nose between the cockpit and the engine compartment and a large double door in the back for easy loading of passengers and cargo.

=== PA-32-300 ===
On 27 May 1966, Piper obtained FAA type certification for a 300 hp (220 kW) version, designated as the PA-32-300. It was offered by the company as a 1967 model.

=== PA-32R ===
The 1975 addition of retractable landing gear resulted in the first of the PA-32R series, the Piper Lance. This was the earliest aircraft in the Piper Saratoga family, Piper's luxury, high-performance single line.

Piper's transition to tapered wings for the Cherokee series resulted in a new wing for the PA-32 series, as well. The tapered-wing version of the Cherokee Six was named the Saratoga and debuted in 1980.

=== Piper 6X ===
After the General Aviation Revitalization Act of 1994, production of the retractable-gear Saratoga resumed in 1995. A fixed-gear PA-32 was reintroduced in 2003 as the Piper 6X and the turbocharged 6XT. Sales of the 6X and 6XT models did not meet expectations and production ceased in late 2007.

=== PA-34 prototype ===
Piper built a prototype PA-32-260 with IO-360 engines mounted on the wings. The trimotor aircraft was the proof-of-concept aircraft for the twin-engined, retractable-gear version of the Cherokee Six, the PA-34 Seneca.

== Variants ==
PA-32-250 Cherokee Six
Prototype with 250hp Lycoming O-540 engine, two built
PA-32-260 Cherokee Six
Production variant with a 260hp Lycoming O-540-E4B5 engine
PA-32-260 Cherokee Six B
1969 model with increased cabin space
PA-32-260 Cherokee Six C
1970 model with minor changes
PA-32-260 Cherokee Six D
1971 model with minor changes
PA-32-260 Cherokee Six E
1972 model with interior and instrument panel changes (note model letters not used after 1972)
PA-32-300 Cherokee Six
Variant with a 300hp Lycoming IO-540-K1A5 engine, named the Piper Six 300 after 1979
PA-32-300 Cherokee Six B
1969 model with instrument panel changes, engine changed to IO-540-K1G5
PA-32-300 Cherokee Six C
1970 model
PA-32-300 Cherokee Six D
1971 model
PA-32-300 Cherokee Six E
1972 model (note model letters not used after 1972)
PA-32-300LD
Experimental low-drag variant for increased fuel efficiency, one built
PA-32S-300
Factory built on floats, only a small number were made.
PA-32-301 Saratoga
Variant from 1980 with a 300hp Lycoming IO-540-K1G5 engine
PA-32-301T Turbo Saratoga
Saratoga with a turbocharged Lycoming TIO-540-S1AD engine and revised cowling
PA-32-3M
PA-32 prototype modified as a three-engined aircraft with two 115-hp Lycoming O-235 engines fitted to the wings, for development of the PA-34 Seneca
Embraer EMB-720C Minuano
Brazilian license-built version of PA-32-300 Cherokee Six.
Embraer EMB-720D Minuano
Brazilian license-built version of PA-32-301 Saratoga Fixed Gear version. Production by Embraer and its subsidiary Indústria Aeronáutica Neiva.
Embraer EMB-721C Sertanejo
Brazilian license-built version of PA-32R-301 Lance.
Embraer EMB-721D Sertanejo
Brazilian license-built version of PA-32R-301 Saratoga Retractable Gear version. Production by Embraer and its subsidiary Neiva.

== Specifications (1972 model PA-32-300) ==
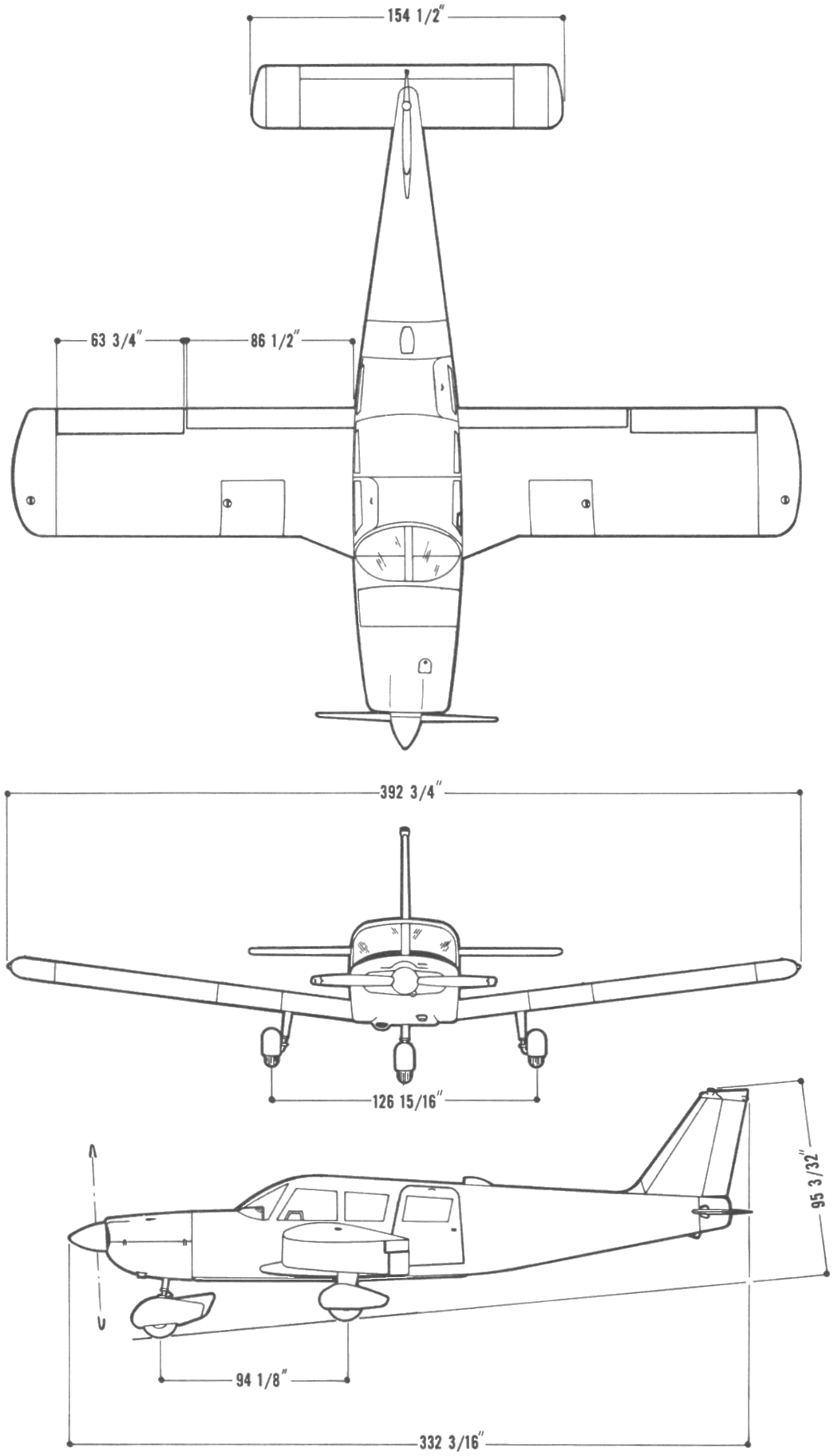
3-view line drawing of the Piper PA-32-260 Cherokee Six

Data from 1972 Piper Cherokee Six 300 "E" Owner's Handbook

General characteristics

- Crew: One
- Capacity: five passengers (or six with optional seat)
- Length: 27 ft 8 in (8.4 m)
- Wingspan: 32 ft 10 in (10.0 m)
- Height: 7 ft 11 in (2.4 m)
- Wing area: 174.5 sq ft (16.5 m^{2})
- Airfoil: NACA 65-415
- Empty weight: 1,788 lb (811 kg)
- Gross weight: 3,400 lb (1,542 kg)
- Powerplant: 1 × Lycoming IO-540-K1A5 piston, flat six, 300 hp (225 kW)

Performance

- Maximum speed: 174 mph (280 km/h, 151 kn)
- Cruise speed: 168 mph (272 km/h, 146 kn)
- Range: 840 mi (1,361 km, 730 nmi)
- Service ceiling: 16,250 ft (4,950 m)
- Rate of climb: 1,050 ft/min (5.3 m/s)
