= Chincul =

Argentine aircraft manufacturing company

Chincul SACAIFI
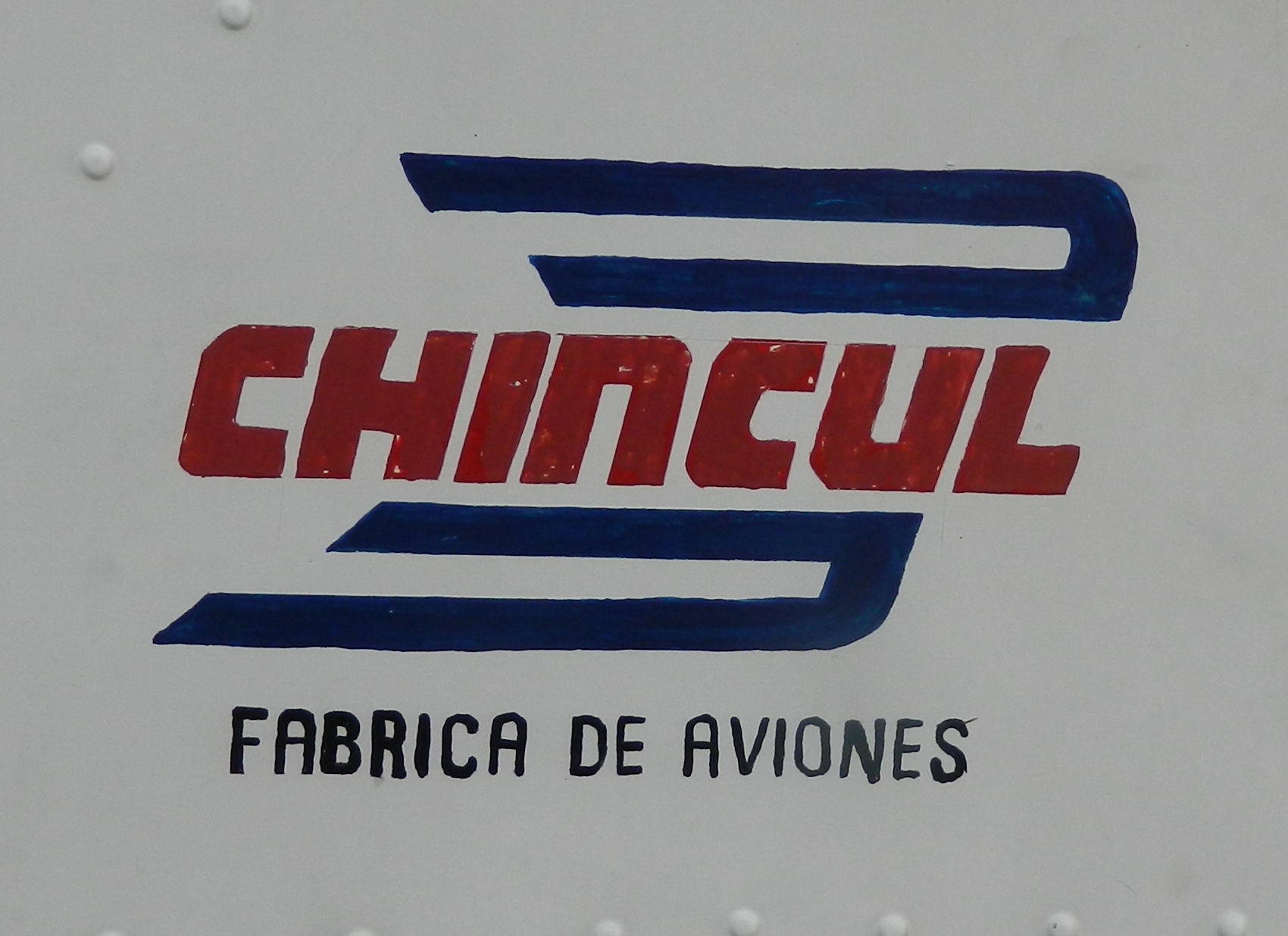
- Company type: Private
- Industry: Aeronautics
- Founded: 1972
- Headquarters: San Juan, Argentina
- Products: Civil Aircraft; Military training aircraft
- Number of employees: 500 (1978)

Chincul SACAIFI was an aircraft manufacturing company in Argentina. The company built Piper Aircraft under license. It was a wholly owned subsidiary of "La Macarena S.A.", Piper's Argentine distributor.

== History ==
In response to the considerable aging and reduction of the inventory of the country's air fleet, the FAA encouraged a plan for the progressive replacement of the fleet through manufacturers of national origin.

For this the landowner of Buenos Aires, José María Beraza, inspired by Alejandro Agustín Lanusse

The inauguration of the plant occurred on December 12, 1972.

It was decided to manufacture aircraft under license from Piper Aircraft Corporation, the largest light aircraft factory in the world, with bases in Lock Haven, Vero Beach, Renovo and Quehanna, in the United States, thanks to Piper's licensed production plan to produce aircraft. abroad, it envisaged assembly in emerging third world countries, with the main benefit of commercial penetration and the reduction of labor costs that this implied.

Industrial promotion policies at the time allowed manufacturers who settled in certain areas of the country to have tax reductions and deferrals. Therefore, the owners of Chincul settled in the town of Pocito in the province of San Juan.

There they built two 70 m by 110 m hangars, one for production and another for finishing. These plus other sectors and annexed workshops made for a total covered area of 14,000 m^{2.}

=== Chincul's golden age ===
The plant maintained a simultaneous process with 10 assembly lines, with about 450 employees (between technicians and aeronautical mechanics), working 24 hours a day, 365 days a year "24x7".

In total they produced some 960 aircraft, which constituted an absolute record and a demonstration of the country's industrial capacity.

=== Final years and bankruptcy ===
By the middle of the 1980s, the Sanjuanina plant started a slow downward slope due to the inflationary process that was experienced at that time, in addition to the bankruptcy of its Piper Aircraft mother house.

The Cuyano settlement of the Beraza tried to keep the head for a while longer, but 10 years of setbacks prevented it.

Finally, between 1991 and 1994, a final series of the PA-18 Super Club model was produced, definitively ceasing the activity on January 31, 1995, the date on which its huge gates were closed at the Pocito plant.

Today the facilities offer the image of a sad abandonment, which contrasts crudely with those industrial buildings covered with airplanes.

== Production ==
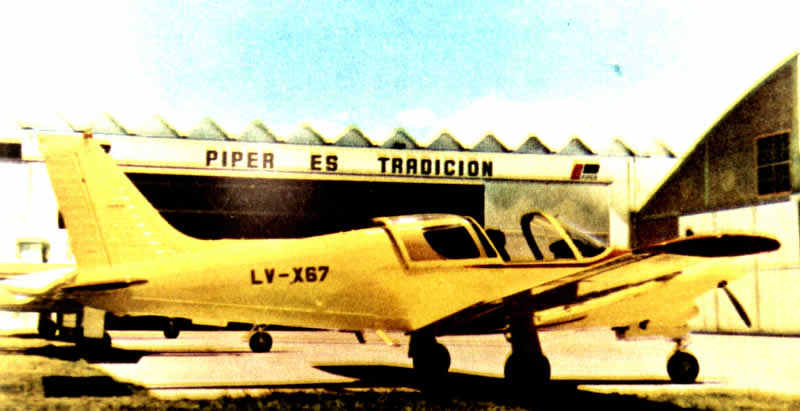
Chincul-built PA-28 Arrow

Chincul built by license Piper aircraft:

- Piper PA-28 Cherokee — 960
- Piper PA-31 Navajo
- Piper PA-32R — 26

=== Other models ===
Chincul had a manufacturing project under license for the Bell 212 and Bell 412SP in the San Juan province.

== See also ==
Other aircraft manufacturers in Argentina

- Aero Boero
- FAdeA

== Sources ==
- Remembering Chincul S.A.
