= Piper PA-32R =

Lance/Saratoga six-place aircraft (built 1975–2009)

PA-32R Lance/Saratoga
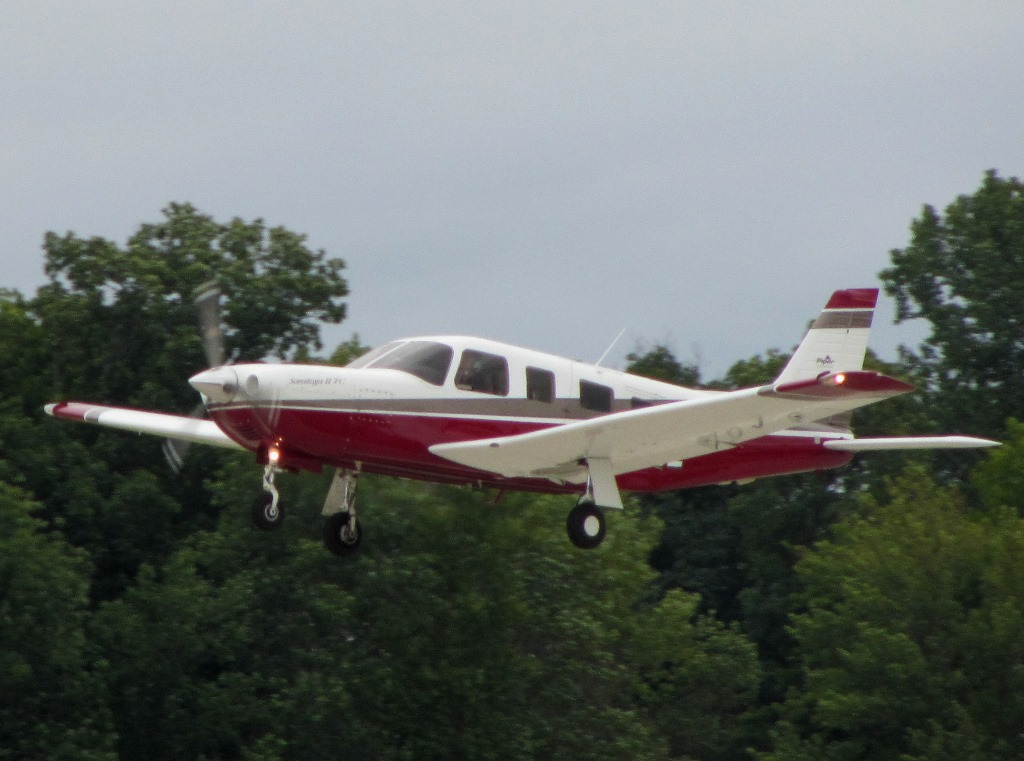
- Piper Saratoga II TC

General information
- Type: Personal use, air taxi & freight aircraft
- National origin: United States
- Manufacturer: Piper Aircraft

History
- Manufactured: 1975–2009
- Introduction date: 1975
- First flight: 30 August 1974
- Developed from: Piper PA-32 Cherokee Six

The Piper PA-32R is a six-seat (or seven-seat), high-performance, single engine, all-metal, fixed-wing aircraft produced by Piper Aircraft of Vero Beach, Florida. The design began life as the Piper Lance, a retractable-gear version of the Piper Cherokee Six. Later models became known by the designation Piper Saratoga. The primary difference between the Lance and early Saratoga is the development of a tapered wing on the Saratoga, replacing the "Hershey bar" wing on the Lance that was a carryover from the Cherokee Six. Later Saratoga models provided updated/improved avionics, engine and interior touches but retained the same airframe design.

Production of the Saratoga was discontinued in 2009.

The Saratoga competed for sales with the Beechcraft Bonanza, Mooney M20, Cirrus SR22, Cessna 210, and Cessna 350.

== Development ==
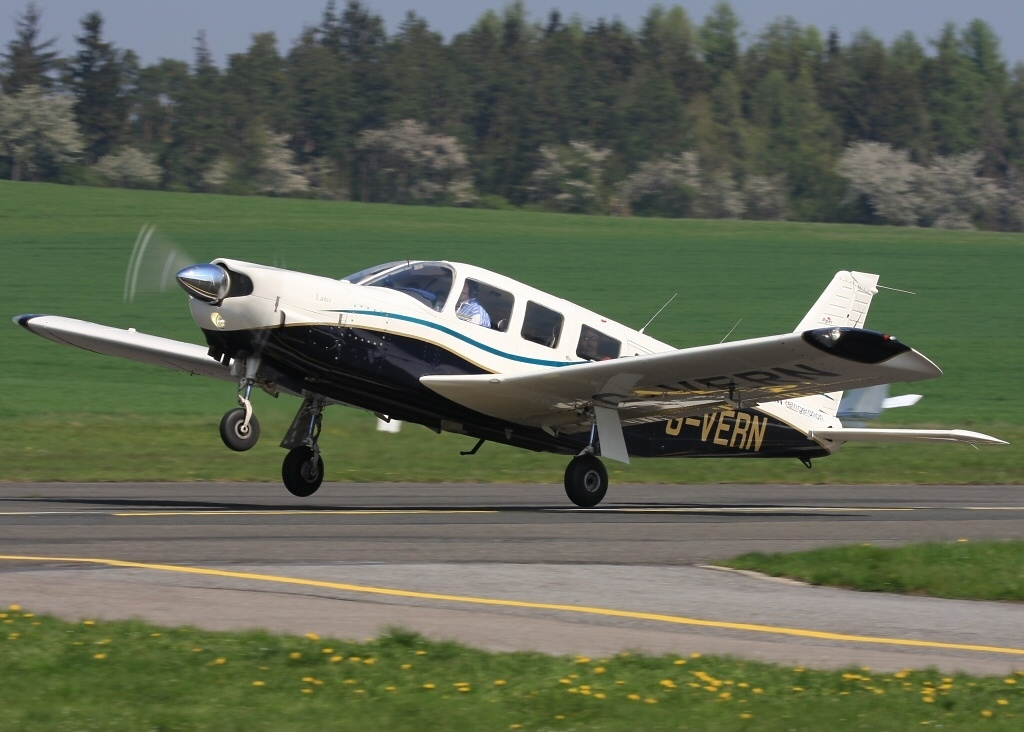
An initial PA-32R-300 Cherokee Lance, with a standard tail

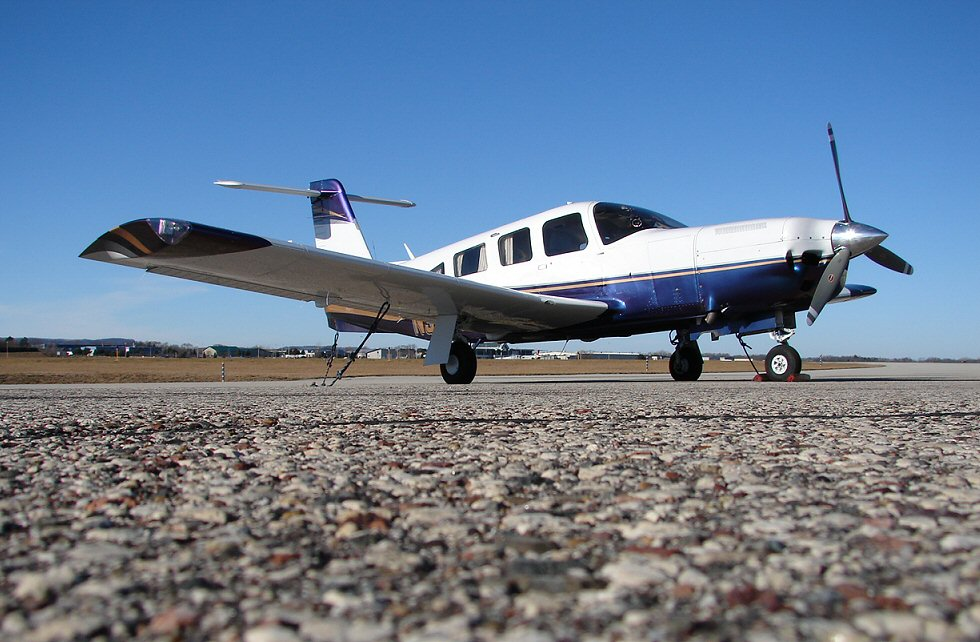
A later PA-32RT-300T Turbo Lance II with a T-tail

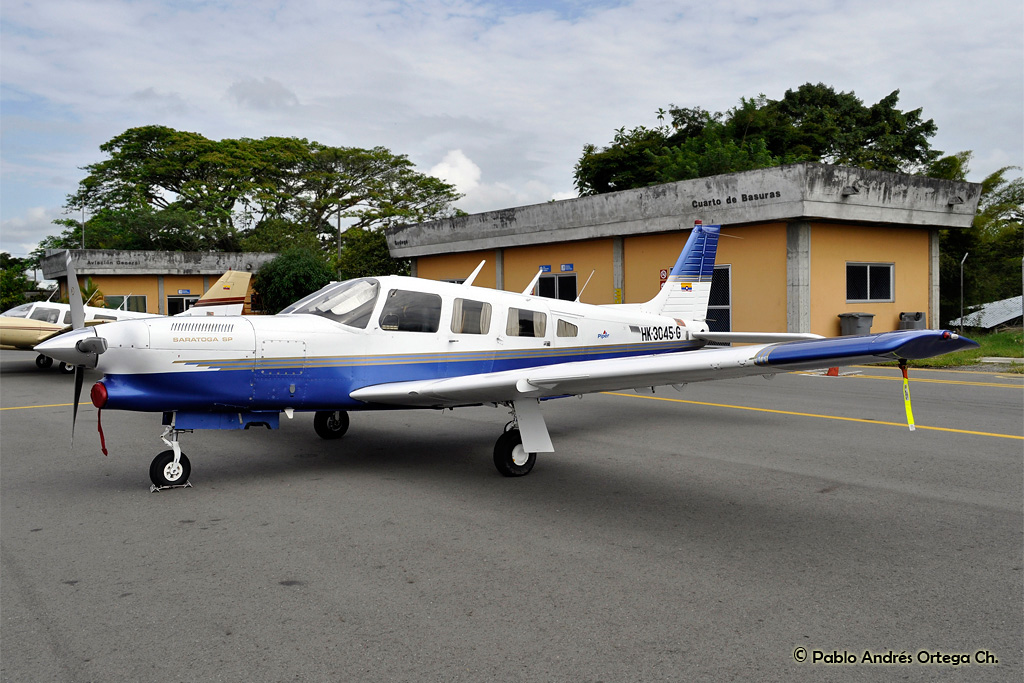
PA-32R-301T Turbo Saratoga SP with a single intake below the propeller and a standard tail

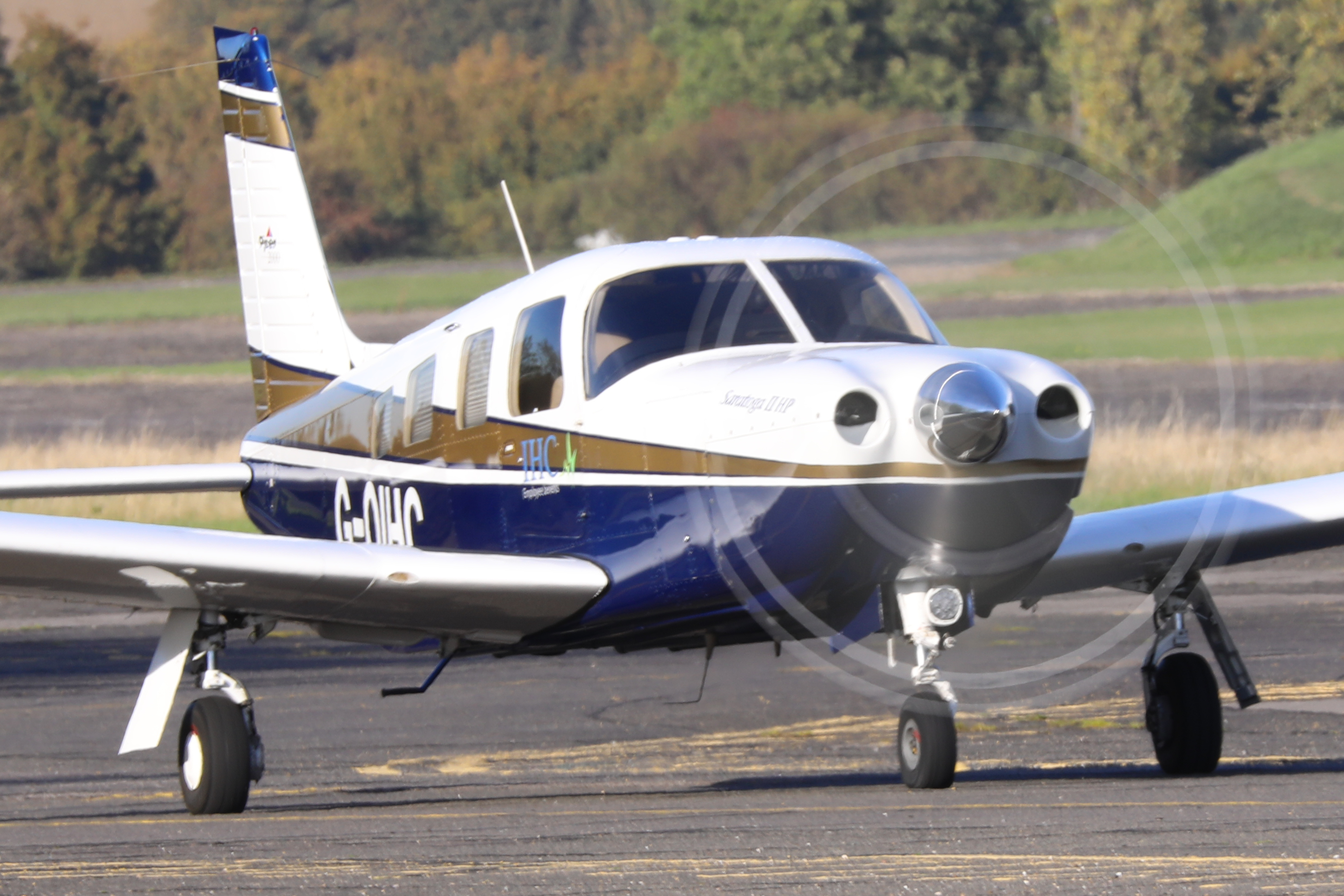
PA-32R-301 Saratoga II with round inlets

Until 1972, when the assembly line was destroyed in a flood, the Comanche was Piper's luxury, high-performance single. Afterwards, Piper began modifying its heavy-lifting single engined PA-32 Cherokee Six, adding retractable landing gear and designating the type as the "PA-32R".

The PA-32R was built under license by Embraer in Brazil as the Embraer EMB-721 Sertanejo.

Kits for the PA-32R-300 (six supplied), PA-32RT-300 (16) and PA-32RT-300T (two) were supplied to Chincul in Argentina for completion. They were designated the PA-A-32R and PA-A-32RT.

For the 2008 model year, the Saratoga II HP (normally aspirated) model was eliminated, along with the 6X and 6XT (fixed-gear versions of the Saratoga), leaving the turbocharged Saratoga II TC as the only production model in the PA-32 line. Production of all PA-32 models ended in 2009.

== Variants ==
PA-32R-300 (1976–1978)
Marketed as the Piper Cherokee Lance. Initial version of the retractable PA-32 line, with a standard tail.

PA-32RT-300 (1978–1979)
After the first half of 1978, Piper modified the tail to a "T" design with the stabilator (horizontal stabilizer/elevator) moved to the top of the vertical tail. Many pilots and owners complained about the T-tail's lack of authority at low speeds. Beginning with this model, the Cherokee name was officially dropped and the model was named the Lance II.

PA-32RT-300T (1978–1979)
Also in 1978, a turbocharged version, designated the Turbo Lance II, was introduced. It has a service ceiling of 20,000 ft (6,096 m) with a rate of climb of 1050 ft/min (5.4 m/s). It can cruise at 10,000 ft (3,048 m) at 175 kn (324 km/h) true airspeed at 75% power burning 20 gal/h. Fuel capacity is 94 U.S. gallons (360 L; 78 imp gal) usable. The aircraft was the first to feature a distinctive large oval, single air intake below the propeller hub.

PA-32R-301 (1980–2007)
The 1980 models reverted to a standard tail design, and were named the Saratoga SP. In 1993, the airplane received several cosmetic and systems updates and was redesignated as the Saratoga II HP.

PA-32R-301T (1980–2009)
The 1980 turbocharged model was given the name Turbo Saratoga SP. The name and model designation stayed the same through the 1996 model year, despite several updates to the airplane during that time. Starting with the 1997 model year, the airplane received a new designation, the Saratoga II TC, and a new Lycoming TIO-540-AH1A engine. Externally, the biggest difference was the new cowl, with much smaller, round air inlets. The 1997-1998 Saratoga II TCs featured a King avionics suite, which was switched to dual Garmin GNS-430's and a GTX-320 transponder with the 1999 models. In mid-2000 model year, the avionics were again updated, with one Garmin GNS-430 and one GNS-530 and a GTX-327 transponder as standard equipment. Beginning in 2004, the Saratoga models were available with an Avidyne Entegra "Glass Panel" avionics system, which was replaced by the Garmin G1000 in 2007.

EMB-721C Sertanejo
License built variant of the PA-32R-300 and PA-32RT-300, 150 built.
EMB-721D Sertanejo
License built variant of the PA-32R-301, 55 built.

== Accidents ==
- John F. Kennedy Jr., along with his wife, Carolyn Bessette-Kennedy, and sister-in-law Lauren Bessette died on July 16, 1999, when the Saratoga Kennedy was flying crashed into the Atlantic Ocean 7 miles (11 km) off the coast of Martha's Vineyard due to spatial disorientation. Kennedy's estimated total flight experience was about 310 hours, of which 55 hours were at night. His estimated flight time in the accident airplane was about 36 hours, of which about 9.4 hours were at night.
- Michael Connell, founder of New Media Communications, Govtech, and Connell Donatelli Inc. and the primary Republican Party information technology expert for Karl Rove, George W. Bush, and John McCain, among others, died on December 19, 2008, when the Saratoga he was flying crashed while attempting an approach for landing into Akron-Canton Airport. Connell was an instrument rated pilot with over 500 hours. According to the National Transportation Safety Board (NTSB) report on the accident, Connell flew into adverse weather conditions where icing conditions existed, after having been warned about them.
- On August 8, 2009, a Saratoga and a Eurocopter AS350 collided in midair over the Hudson River near Hoboken, New Jersey, under visual flight rules. All on board both aircraft died in the accident.
- On March 4, 2024, a Piper PA-32RT-300T lost power and crashed in a grassy area adjacent to Interstate 40 in Nashville, Tennessee, killing all onboard. The victims were pilot Victor Dotsenko, his wife Rimma, and their three children, all from King, Ontario. The plane left from Mount Sterling, Kentucky, flew into Nashville from the southwest, and overflew John C. Tune Airport at 2,500 feet. After the plane's engine lost power, the air traffic controller tried to steer Dotsenko toward a runway. The pilot made a U-turn and said, "Yes, I have the runway in sight," and then added, "I’m too far away, I won’t make it."

== Specifications (Cherokee Lance PA-32R-300) ==
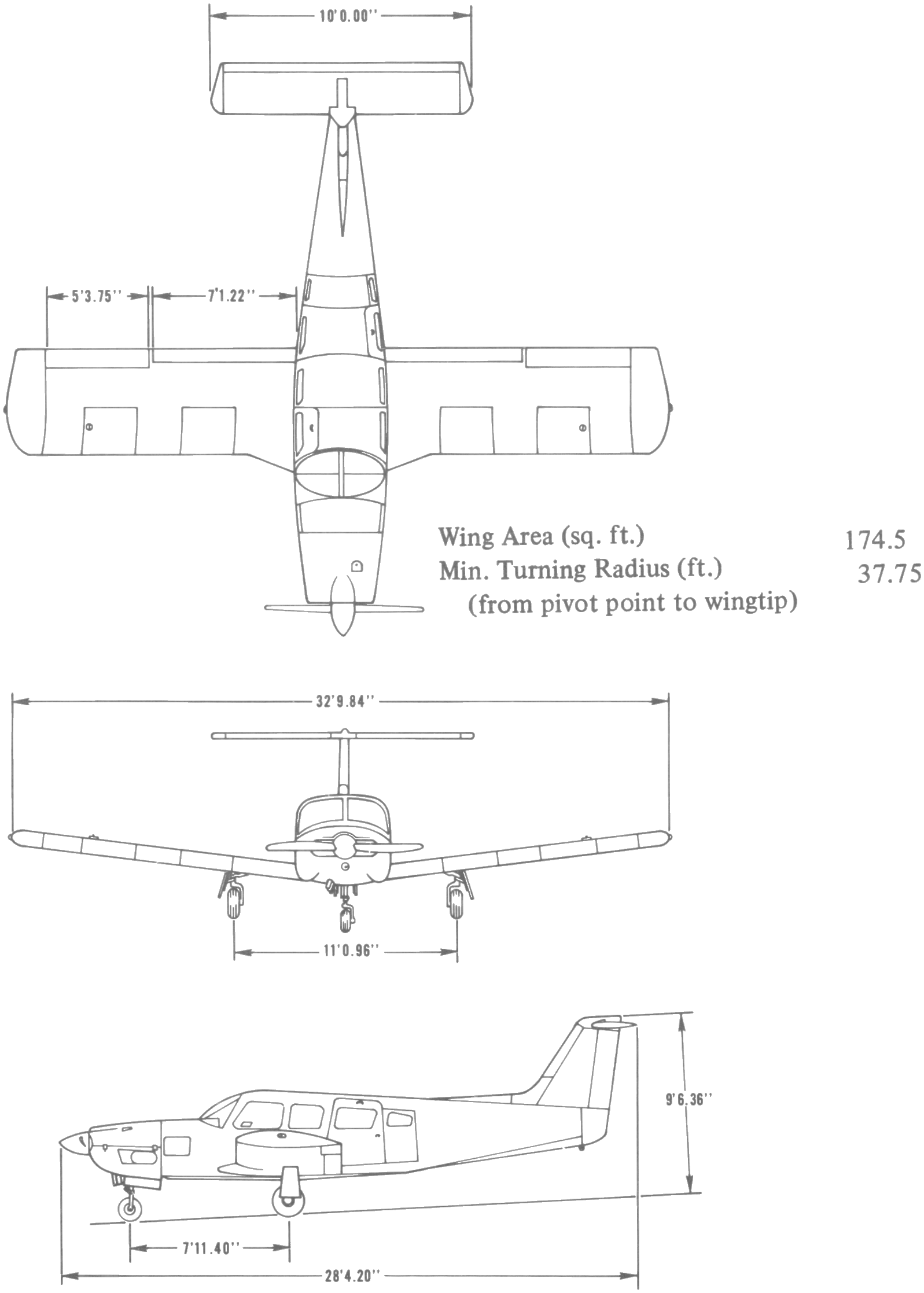
3-view line drawing of the Piper PA-32RT-300 Lance II

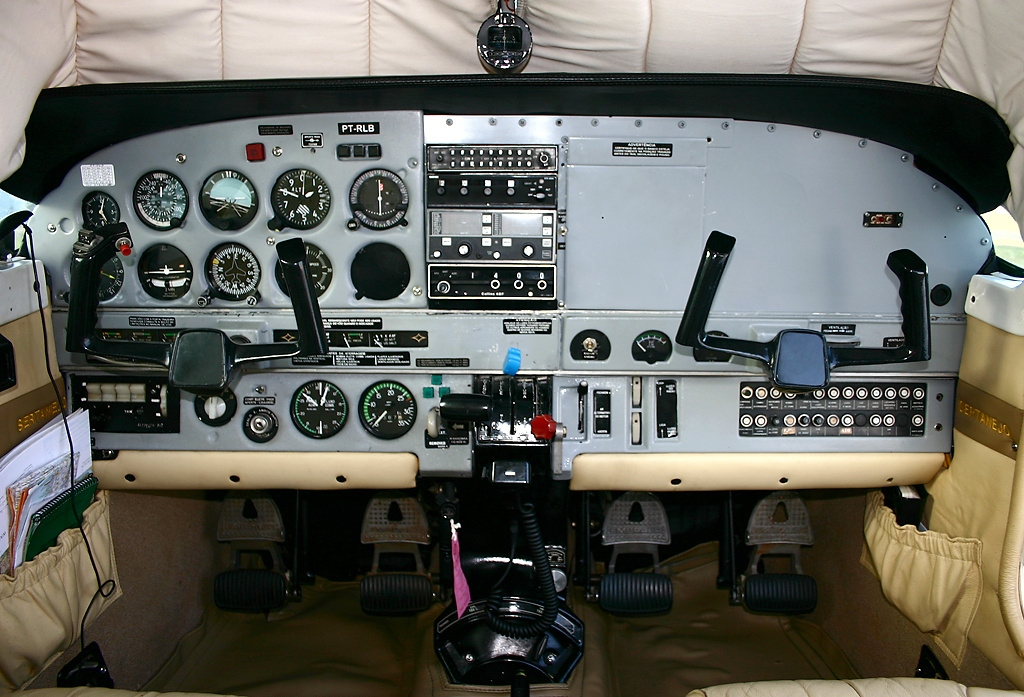
Classic flight deck of a license-built Sertanejo

Data from Cherokee Lance Information Manual

General characteristics

- Capacity: up to seven occupants
- Length: 27 ft 9 in (8.46 m)
- Wingspan: 32 ft 10 in (10.01 m)
- Height: 9 ft 6 in (2.90 m)
- Wing area: 174.5 sq ft (16.21 m^{2})
- Aspect ratio: 6.2
- Empty weight: 1,980 lb (898 kg)
- Gross weight: 3,600 lb (1,633 kg)
- Fuel capacity: 94 US gal (360 L) usable
- Powerplant: 1 × Lycoming IO-540-K1G5D 6 cylinder, direct drive, horizontally opposed, air cooled engine, 300 hp (220 kW) at 2700 rpm
- Propellers: 2-bladed Hartzell Constant Speed, 6 ft 8 in (2.03 m) diameter

Performance

- Maximum speed: 157 kn (181 mph, 291 km/h) max cruise at 75% power and 7500 feet
- Cruise speed: 142 kn (163 mph, 263 km/h) at 65% power and 6000 feet
- Range: 875 nmi (1,007 mi, 1,620 km) at 55% power, 9000, 45mn reserve - 975 nmi (1,806 km) with no reserve
- Endurance: 7 hours at 55% power, SL, 45mn reserve - 7h¾ with no reserve
- Service ceiling: 15,000 ft (4,600 m)
- Rate of climb: 1,000 ft/min (5.1 m/s) 3600lb, SL, gear up, full throttle, 92 kn
- Fuel consumption: 0.57 (Note: 13.8 US gal (52 L)/h at 142 kn (263 km/h) TAS, 6000, 65% power, ISA) lb/mi (0.16 kg/km)

== See also ==
- Piper PA-32 Cherokee Six
