= ENAER Ñamcú =

Chilean light aircraft design

ECH-02 Ñamcú
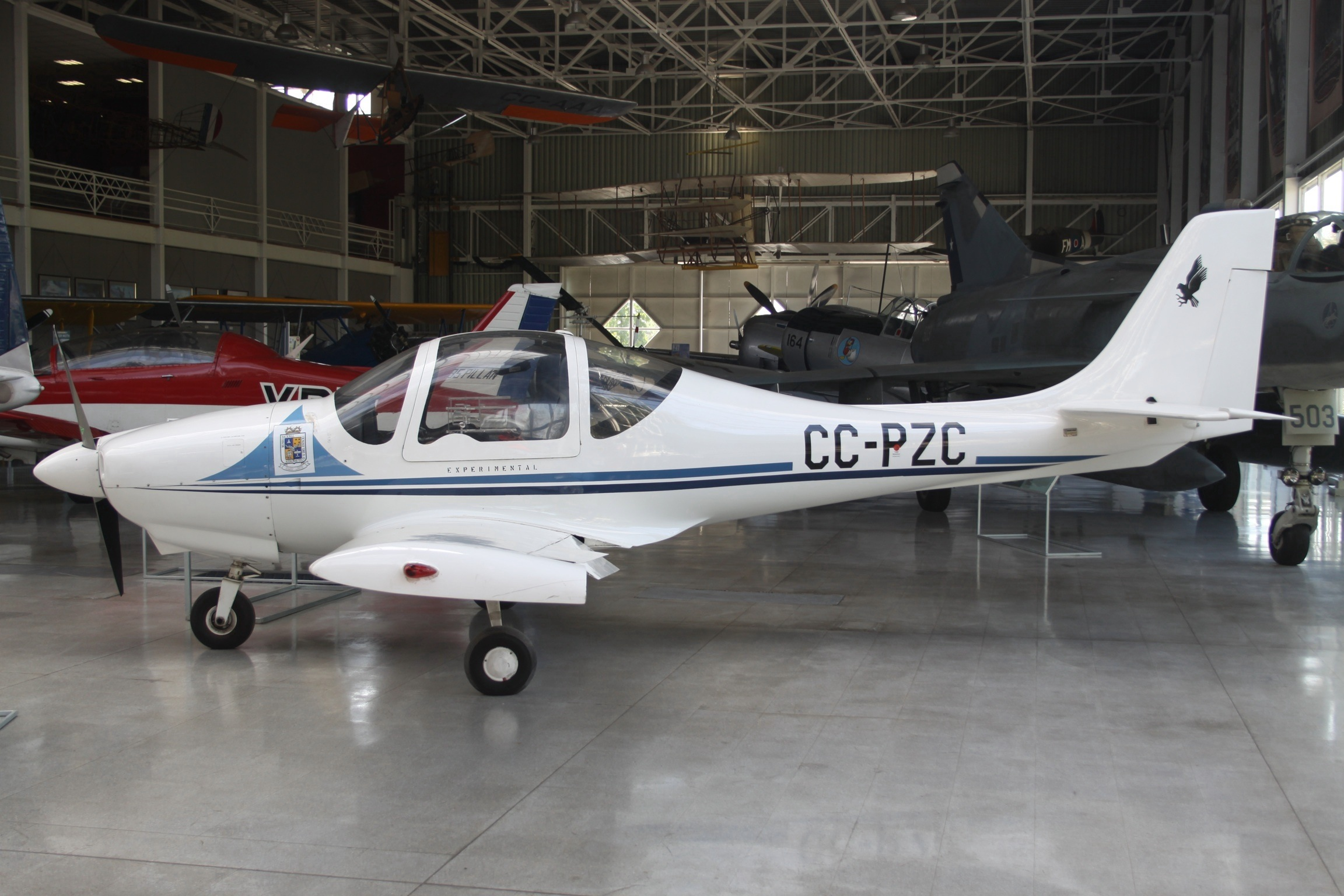

General information
- Type: Two-seat light aircraft
- National origin: Chile
- Manufacturer: ENAER

History
- First flight: April 1989

The ENAER ECH-02 Ñamcú was a single-engine, two-seat, light aircraft, designed and built by the Chilean manufacturer ENAER. A first prototype flew in 1989, and while the joint venture company Euro-ENAER was set up to build the aircraft in the Netherlands as the Euro-Enaer Eaglet, these plans failed when Euro-ENAER went bankrupt in 2002.

== Design and development ==
The Chilean Air Force established an aircraft manufacturing arm, IndAer, in 1980, which began by assembling Piper PA-28 Dakotas and building the ENAER T-35 Pillán military light trainer, which was developed by Piper for manufacture in Chile. IndAer became ENAER (Empresa Nacional de Aeronáutica de Chile), a separate state-owned company, in 1984.

In 1986, ENAER began work on its first entirely indigenous aircraft, a two-seat, single-engined light aircraft suitable for use by flying clubs as a training aircraft. As such, the project (at first known as the Avion Livano (light aircraft)), was to be inexpensive, with a price of US$70,000 claimed in 1991.

The Ñamcú was a low-wing tractor monoplane with a fixed nosewheel undercarriage. It was of all-composite construction, with most of the structure made of glassfibre and polyurethane sandwich material, while the wing spars were made of a mixture of glassfibre and carbon fibre. The crew of two sat side by side in a fully enclosed cockpit, with gull-wing doors. A 115 hp (86 kW) Textron Lycoming O-235-N2C flat-four piston engine drove a two-bladed fixed-pitch propeller.

The first prototype made its maiden flight in April 1989, with three more prototypes following, one of which crashed on 11 February 1992 following a bird strike, killing the pilot.

After attempts to interest the Chilean Air Force in the Ñamcú failed, ENAER set up Euro-ENAER, a joint venture with the Delft University of Technology and Dutch investors, to certify the aircraft as airworthy in the Netherlands under European regulations, with ENAER hoping to sell 50 aircraft per year, at a price which had now increased to US$100,000 an aircraft. By 1998, it was planned to assemble a modified version of the aircraft, powered by a 150 hp (110 kW) Textron Lycoming O-320-D2A engine, in a new factory in the Netherlands. Certification of the Eaglet was expected by late that year, with the aircraft having a price of $120,000. In early 1999, Euro-ENAER was blaming poor weather and difficulties with the Joint Aviation Authorities for delays in certification for the Eaglet, whose unit price had now reached US$160,000, although the company was now forecasting annual sales of 50 per year in Europe and 200 a year in America. Euro-ENAER finally managed to certify the Eaglet in 2001, but the company announced it needed additional funding to start production. These efforts failed, however, and Euro-ENAER was declared bankrupt later that year.

== Specifications (Ñamcú) ==
Data from Brassey's World Aircraft & Systems Directory 1999/2000

General characteristics

- Crew: one
- Capacity: one passenger
- Length: 7.05 m (23 ft 2 in)
- Wingspan: 8.31 m (27 ft 3 in)
- Height: 2.42 m (7 ft 11 in)
- Wing area: 10.01 m^{2} (107.7 sq ft)
- Airfoil: NACA 63_{2}415
- Empty weight: 546 kg (1,204 lb)
- Max takeoff weight: 800 kg (1,764 lb)
- Fuel capacity: 100 L (26 US gal; 22 imp gal)
- Powerplant: 1 × Textron Lycoming O-235-N2C air-cooled flat-four, 87 kW (116 hp)
- Propellers: 2-bladed fixed-pitch propeller, 1.78 m (5 ft 10 in) diameter

Performance

- Maximum speed: 235 km/h (146 mph, 127 kn)
- Cruise speed: 191 km/h (119 mph, 103 kn) (75% power)
- Stall speed: 93 km/h (58 mph, 50 kn) (flaps extended)
- Never exceed speed: 328 km/h (204 mph, 177 kn)
- Range: 926 km (575 mi, 500 nmi) (maximum fuel)
- Endurance: 3.6 hr
- Service ceiling: 4,270 m (14,010 ft)
- g limits: +4.4, -2.2
