= St. Louis PT-LM-4 =

PT-LM-4
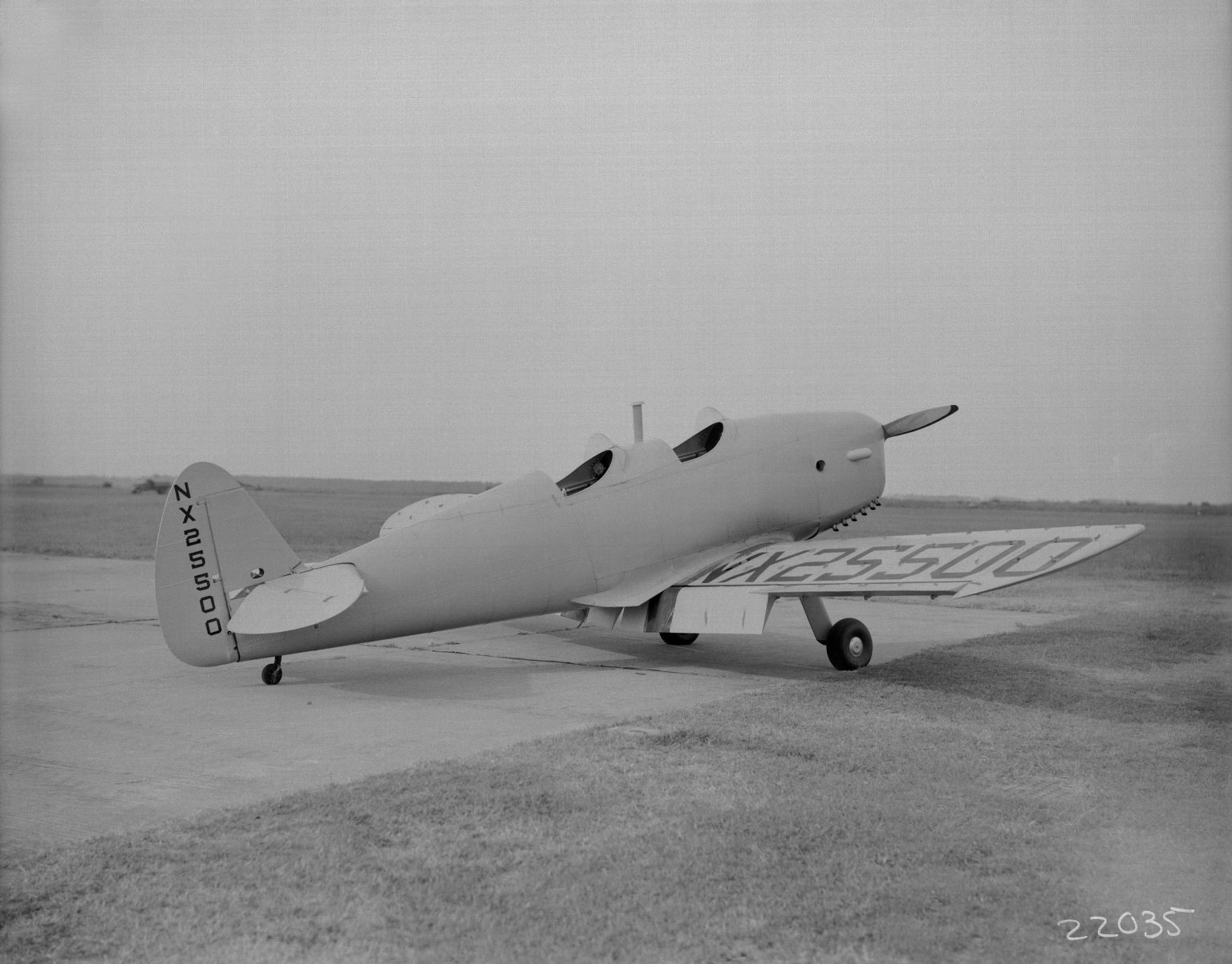
- PT-LM-4

General information
- Type: Primary trainer
- National origin: United States
- Manufacturer: St. Louis Aircraft Corporation

History
- First flight: 1940

The St. Louis PT-LM-4 was a primary trainer design for use in the Civilian Pilot Training Program of World War II.

== Design ==
The PT-LM-4 was a low-wing, open cockpit, tandem seat, trainer with conventional landing gear, powered by a 180 hp (134 kW) Ranger 6-440C-3 engine. The fuselage was constructed of welded steel tubing with aluminum skins. The wings used aluminum construction with aircraft fabric covering. Fairchild won the training contract, with St. Louis Aircraft Company building licensed versions of the PT-19 instead.

== Specifications (PT-LM-4) ==
Data from Skyways

General characteristics

- Crew: 2
- Length: 24 ft 9 in (7.54 m)
- Wingspan: 30 ft (9.1 m)
- Height: 7 ft 10 in (2.39 m)
- Wing area: 157 sq ft (14.6 m^{2})
- Gross weight: 2,012 lb (913 kg)
- Powerplant: 1 × Ranger 6-440C-3 inline piston engine, 180 hp (130 kW)

Performance

- Maximum speed: 119 kn (137 mph, 220 km/h)
- Cruise speed: 109 kn (125 mph, 201 km/h)
- Range: 300 nmi (345 mi, 555 km)
- Service ceiling: 18,000 ft (5,500 m)
- Rate of climb: 1,000 ft/min (5.1 m/s)

== See also ==
Aircraft of comparable role, configuration, and era

- Fairchild PT-19
