= Maestranza Central de Aviación HF XX-02 =

HF XX-02

General information
- Type: Military trainer
- National origin: Chile
- Manufacturer: Maestranza Central de Aviación
- Designer: Hugo Fuentes
- Number built: 2

History
- First flight: 1954; 72 years ago

The Maestranza Central de Aviación HF XX-02 was a military trainer aircraft developed in Chile in the 1950s.

== Design and development ==
Designed by Hugo Fuentes (hence the HF in the designation), the HF XX-02 was a conventional, low-wing cantilever monoplane of mixed construction with fixed tailwheel undercarriage. The pilot and instructor sat side by side.

Two prototypes were constructed at El Bosque Air Base, designated XX-02 and XX-02B. Development was abandoned due to difficulties maneuvering at lower altitudes, which in one case, led to a crash in which the instructor was killed while attempting to land after a tight turn at low altitude.

The design was subsequently refined by Francisco Bravo and an improved version, the HFB XX-02 flew in 1958 powered by a Continental O-470 engine in place of the Ranger L-440 that powered the original.

== Specifications (HFB XX-02) ==
Data from The Illustrated Encyclopedia of Aircraft p.1997

General characteristics

- Crew: Two, pilot and instructor
- Length: 6.60 m (21 ft 8 in)
- Wingspan: 10.10 m (33 ft 2 in)
- Height: 2.15 m (7 ft 1 in)
- Wing area: 16.0 m^{2} (172 sq ft)
- Empty weight: 760 kg (1,675 lb)
- Gross weight: 1,060 kg (2,337 lb)
- Powerplant: 1 × Continental O-470-B , 168 kW (225 hp)

Performance

- Maximum speed: 195 km/h (121 mph, 105 kn)
- Range: 800 km (500 mi, 430 nmi)
- Service ceiling: 4,570 m (15,000 ft)
