= Clinical Hospital of the Chilean Air Force =

Hospital in Santiago, Chile

´General Dr. Raúl Yazigi J´ Clinical Hospital of the Chilean Air Force
- Chilean Air Force Health System

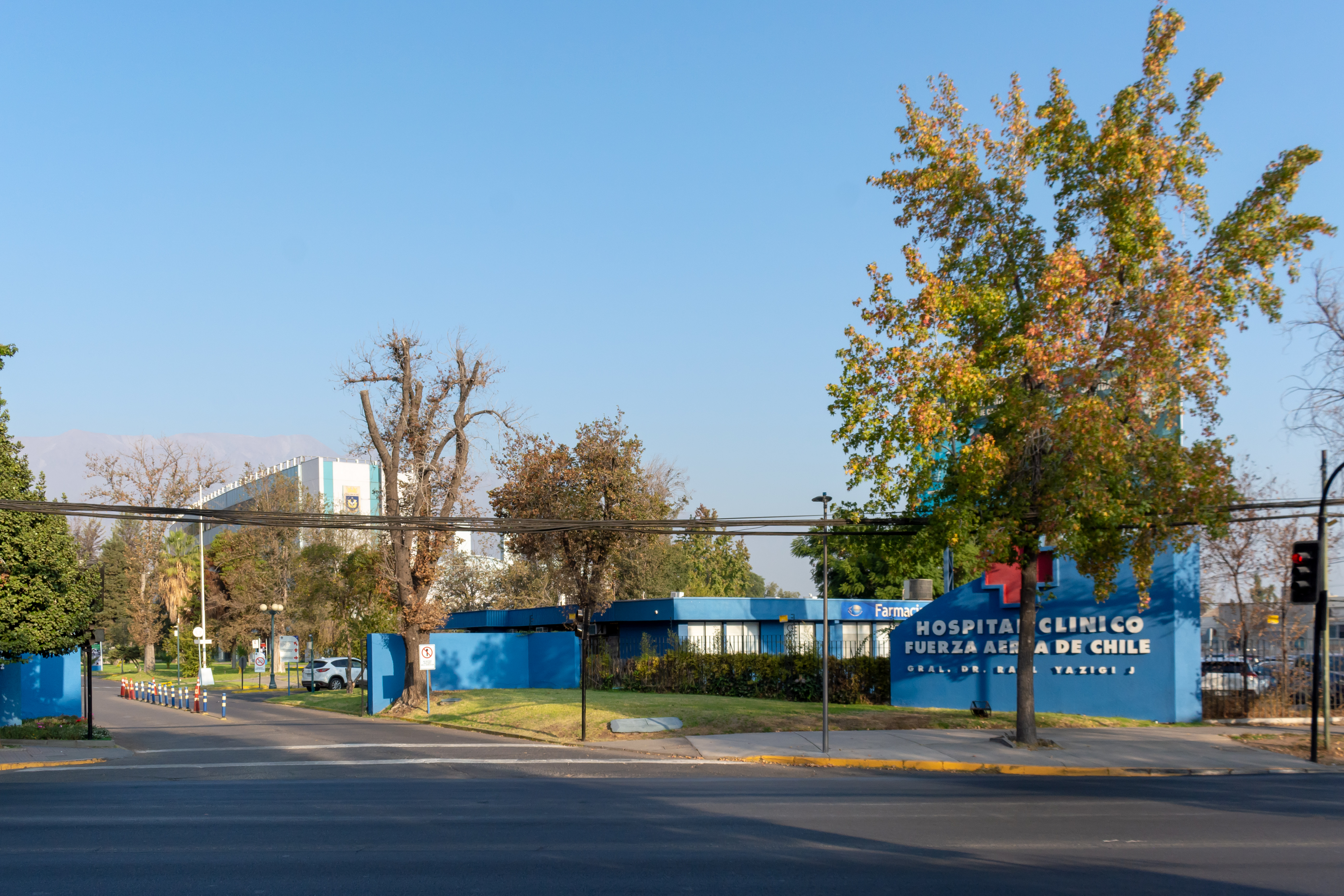

Geography
- Location: Las Condes, Santiago Metropolitan Region, Chile
- Coordinates: 33°23′47″S 70°32′51″W

Organisation
- Type: Military Hospital

Services
- Beds: 192

Helipads
- Helipad: Yes

History
- Opened: 26 August 1958

The Clinical Hospital of the Chilean Airforce is a hospital that is part of the Chilean Air Force´s Health System, located in the Las Condes Commune of Santiago, Chile. The hospital is named after General Raúl Yazigi Jauregui of the Chilean Air Force, and counts 192 beds. The hospital was inaugurated in 1958 in the previous site of the Benedictine Monastery of the Holy Trinity.
