= St. Louis YPT-15 =

US military trainer aircraft

YPT-15
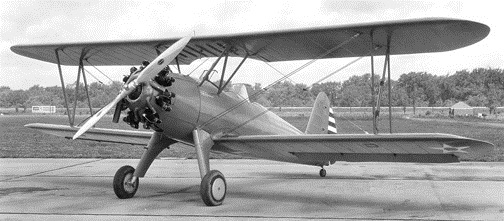

General information
- Type: Primary trainer
- National origin: United States
- Manufacturer: St. Louis Aircraft Corporation
- Primary user: United States Army Air Forces
- Number built: 14

History
- Introduction date: 1940
- Developed from: St. Louis PT-1W

The St. Louis YPT-15 is an American two-seat primary training biplane, built by the St. Louis Aircraft Corporation for use by the United States Army Air Corps. 13 examples of the type were acquired, serving in the late 1930s.

== Design and development ==
The PT-15 was a development of the "off-the-shelf" PT-1W for use by the U.S. Army Air Corps, ordered for stop-gap duty in the training of airmen in the build-up to World War II. The wings were fabric covered, but the fuselage was aluminum covered. A single Wright R-760 radial engine of 220 horsepower (160 kW) provided power.

== Operational history ==
One prototype PT-1 crashed at Wright field trials on 23 May 1936 bearing the serial number of an older design, the St. Louis PT-35 All thirteen examples of the YPT-15 were locally assigned (as PT-15s) to Parks College Civilian Pilot Training Program. The PT-15 was the only St. Louis design ever acquired by the Army Air Corps.

== Variants ==
XPT-15 (St. Louis Model PT-1, and PT-1W replacement prototype)
One Model PT-1W obtained for evaluation with a 235 hp Wright Whirlwind R-760ET.
YPT-15 (St. Louis Model PT-2)
13 pre-production aircraft with changes to instrumentation, 285hp Wright Whirlwind R-760E-1, and larger rudder. Later designated PT-15.

== Surviving aircraft ==
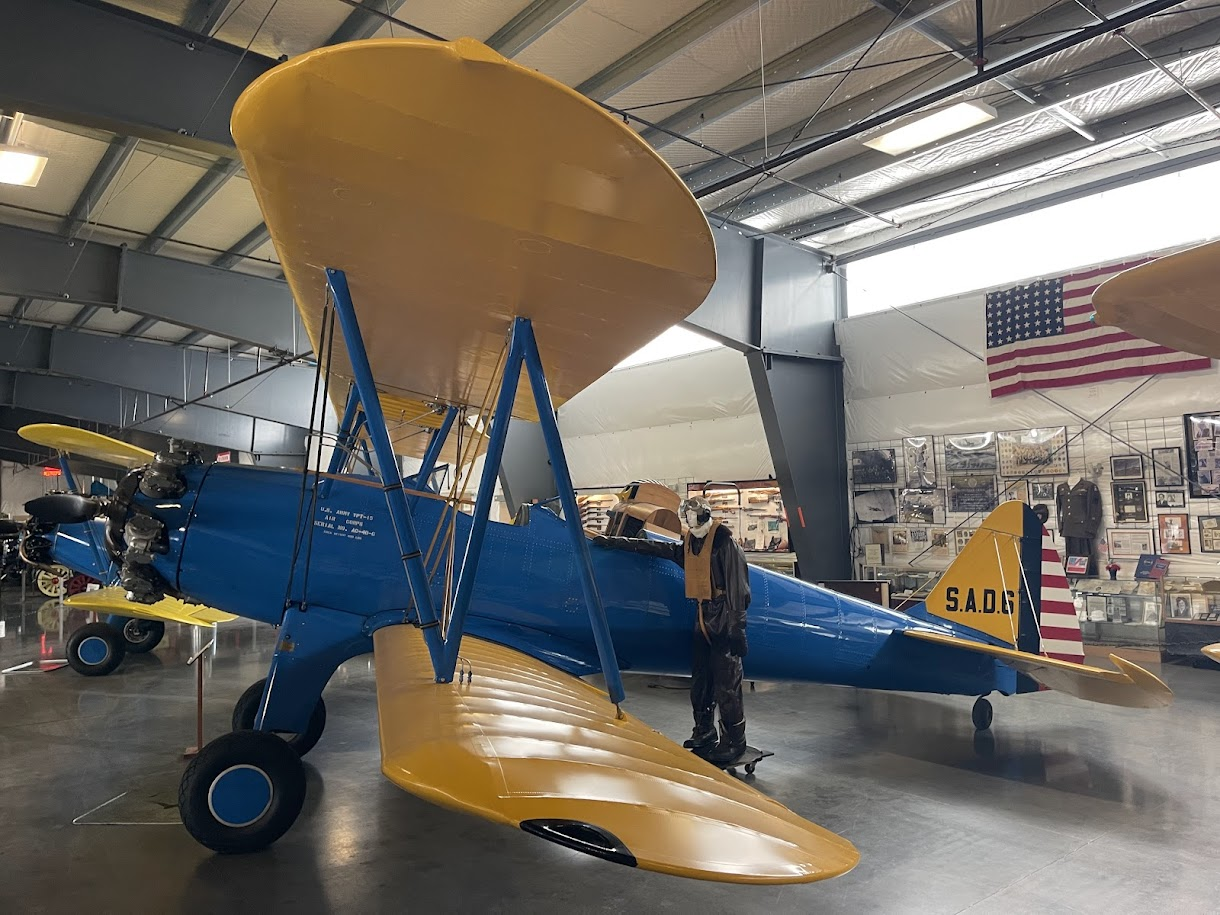
The sole surviving St. Louis YPT-15 on display at the Western Antique Aeroplane and Automobile Museum

- 40-0006 - Maintained in airworthy condition by the Western Antique Aeroplane & Automobile Museum under the registration N106SC. This is the last surviving YPT-15.

== Specifications (PT-15) ==
Data from

General characteristics

- Crew: 2 (instructor and student in tandem)
- Length: 26 ft 5 in (8.05 m)
- Wingspan: 33 ft 10 in (10.31 m)
- Height: 9 ft 5 in (2.87 m)
- Wing area: 279.9 sq ft (26.00 m^{2})
- Empty weight: 2,059 lb (934 kg)
- Gross weight: 2,766 lb (1,255 kg)
- Powerplant: 1 × Wright R-760-1 Whirlwind (Note: Jane's All the World's Aircraft 1942 has the engine type as a 225 hp 7- cylinder Whirlwind R-460-ET but this type number appears to be an error; the other sources give the type used here) 7-cylinder air cooled radial, 225 hp (168 kW)

Performance

- Maximum speed: 130 mph (210 km/h, 110 kn)
- Cruise speed: 116 mph (187 km/h, 101 kn) at 75% power
- Range: 350 mi (560 km, 300 nmi)
- Service ceiling: 15,000 ft (4,600 m)
- Rate of climb: 1,000 ft/min (5.1 m/s) initial

== See also ==
Aircraft of comparable role, configuration, and era

- Boeing Kaydet
- de Havilland Tiger Moth
