= St. Louis Aircraft Corporation =

- Company type: Aircraft manufacturer
- Founded: 1917
- Defunct: 1945
- Headquarters: St. Louis, Missouri
- Products: Aircraft
- Number of employees: 600 (1918)

St. Louis Aircraft Corporation was an American aircraft manufacturer founded in September 1917.

In 1915, the St. Louis Car Company had been approached by Thomas W. Benoist to build 1000 flying boats. A prototype was built, but the concept did not go into production.

In 1917 The United States government needed to form a production interest for World War I aircraft production needs. The St. Louis Aircraft Corporation was founded by A.J. Seigel of the Huttig Sash and Door company, and Edwin B Meissner of the St. Louis Car Company. Their two companies had skilled labor and facilities needed to construct wood-framed aircraft. The company became one of six across the country to produce the Curtiss JN-4D Jenny with first deliveries in 1918. The first order (720552) was for 200 aircraft, the company delivered 30 aircraft a month, and 57 JN-4D's in October 1918.

The company went dormant until 1928 when it started production of the Cardinal and later the Cardinal Senior. The company ordered 100 100 hp Kinner K-T radial engines to power the light monoplane, but production ceased in 1931 in the peak of the depression.

The company continued to build parts while aircraft production was not viable. It specialized in supplying components for the Engineering section at Wright Field. In the buildup to World War II, the company developed its own biplane trainer the St. Louis PT-35, which lost to the Boeing Stearman. It also produced a low winged trainer to compete in an Army contract, the St. Louis PT-LM-4. It lost out to the Fairchild PT-19 model.

The company was put into service again for World War II production. The company subcontracted aircraft parts for the effort and built 44 Fairchild PT-19 and 306 PT-23 licensed aircraft designs. It also was one of 8 companies that competed for a combat troop glider. Its XCG-5 did not go into production.

In 1945, the St. Louis Aircraft Corporation was shut down after wartime contracts ended.

== Aircraft ==
Summary of aircraft built by St. Louis Aircraft
Model name	First flight	Number built	Type
Curtiss JN-4D (license built)	1918		Scout plane
St. Louis Cardinal	1928	21	Sport monoplane
St. Louis PT-35	1935	1	Biplane primary trainer
St. Louis YPT-15	1940	14	Primary Trainer
St. Louis PT-LM-4	1940	1	Primary Trainer
St Louis CG-5	1941	1	Combat glider
PT-19 (License built)	1941	44	Primary trainer
PT-23 (License built)	1941	306	Primary trainer
