= Fairchild PT-19 =

American monoplane primary trainer aircraft in service during WWII

PT-19
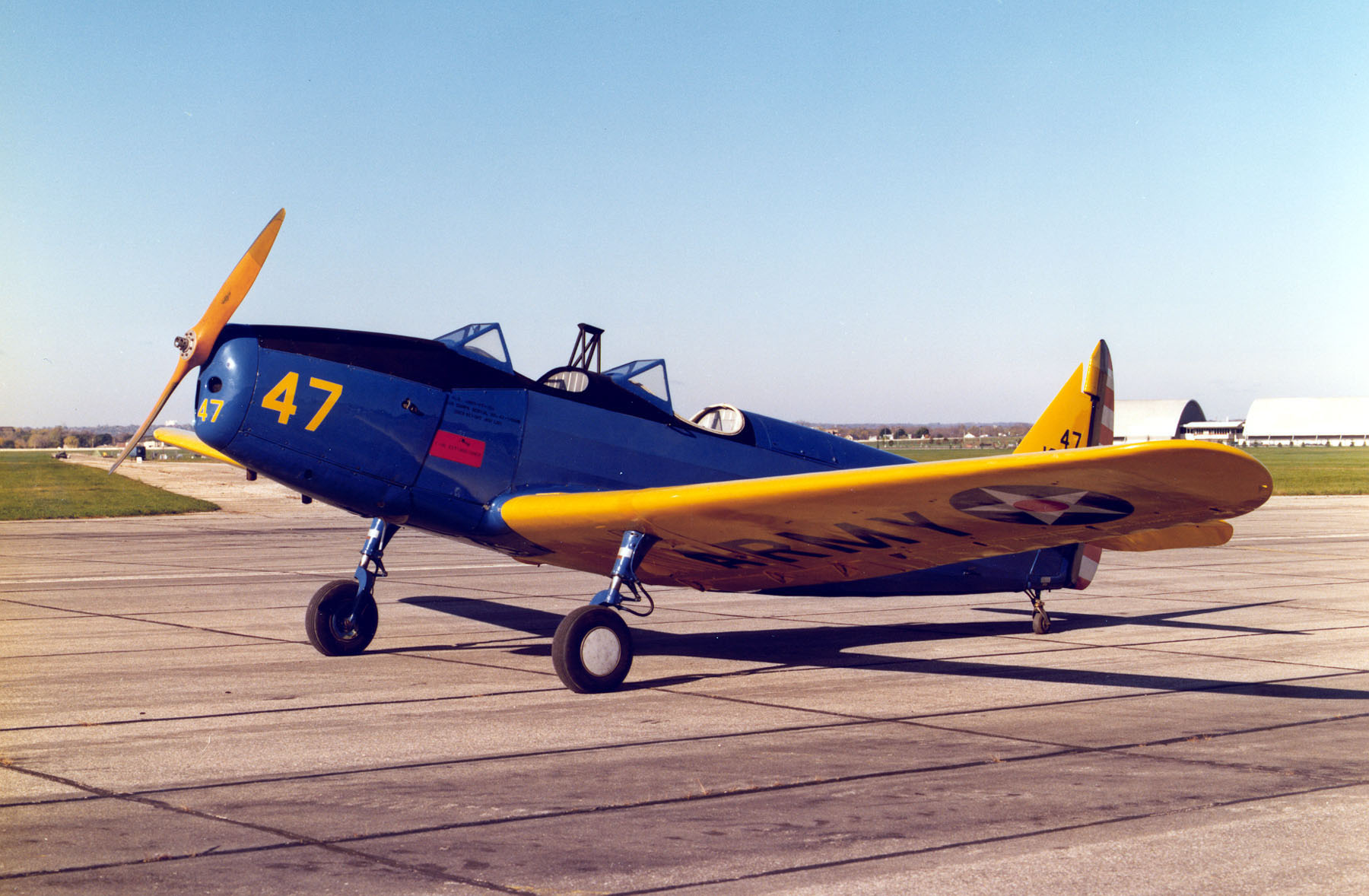
- Fairchild PT-19

General information
- Type: Trainer
- Manufacturer: Fairchild Aircraft
- Primary users: United States Army Air Corps United States Army Air Forces; Royal Canadian Air Force; Royal Air Force
- Number built: 7,700+

History
- Introduction date: 1940
- First flight: 15 May 1939

The Fairchild PT-19 (company designation Fairchild M-62) is an American monoplane primary trainer aircraft that served with the United States Army Air Forces (USAAF), Royal Air Force, and Royal Canadian Air Force during World War II. Designed by Fairchild Aircraft, it was a contemporary of the Kaydet biplane trainer and was used by the USAAF during primary flying training. As with other USAAF trainers of the period, the PT-19 had multiple designations based on the powerplant installed.

== Design and development ==
According to H.L. Puckett, "Still, U.S. pilots were receiving their primary flight training in biplanes, although the low-wing advance trainer was in use. A look around showed that there was no low-wing primary trainer being produced in the U.S. Fairchild felt this urgency and set his organization at work on such a low-wing trainer with the proposal that the new proven Ranger be used as the power plant for the new airplane to be known as the M-62. The M-62, which was to become the PT-19, was to use the experience gained from the F-24 and the more recent Model 46."

In 1933, Fairchild Aircraft Corporation's chief engineer, A.A. Gassner, had hired Armand Thiebolt as his chief structural engineer. In 1937, Thiebolt was named chief engineer and given the task of designing the PT-19. Included in the design was the use of interchangeable parts and nonstrategic materials. According to Puckett, "The proposed low-wing design adapted itself readily to a wide-tread landing gear, which, when combined with judicious wheel location and a low center of gravity, provided protection against ground looping." The Ranger engine would also result in a narrower cowling compared to those using a radial engine, which meant increased visibility for the pilot. The reduced cowling also improved propeller efficiency and an increase in horsepower.

The cantilever wings, with wooden ribs, were covered by 3/32-inch preformed mahogany or fir plywood. The inboard portion consisted of a welded, trussed 4130 structure. The fuselage used Chromoly square tubing for the longerons and brace members and was fabric covered. The cowling was made of Alclad. Both wing center sections contained the 24.5-US-gallon (93 L) fuel tank, with landing gear housings on the outboard ends. The oleo struts were designed to withstand a 6-g acceleration from a 30-inch (76 cm) drop. Two hollow-box wood spars were used in the wing and center sections. Duramold was used to cover the wings. Early models used aluminum-alloy seats made by the Budd Company, while later models used plywood seats made by Hughes Aircraft Company. Early models had metal floors and flaps, while later models used wood for both. The vertical and horizontal stabilizers were made of spruce spars, covered with 1/16 in (1.6 mm) plywood. According to Puckett, "Moisture became the arch enemy of the Fairchild PT and was responsible for the relatively small survival rate of the airplanes built."

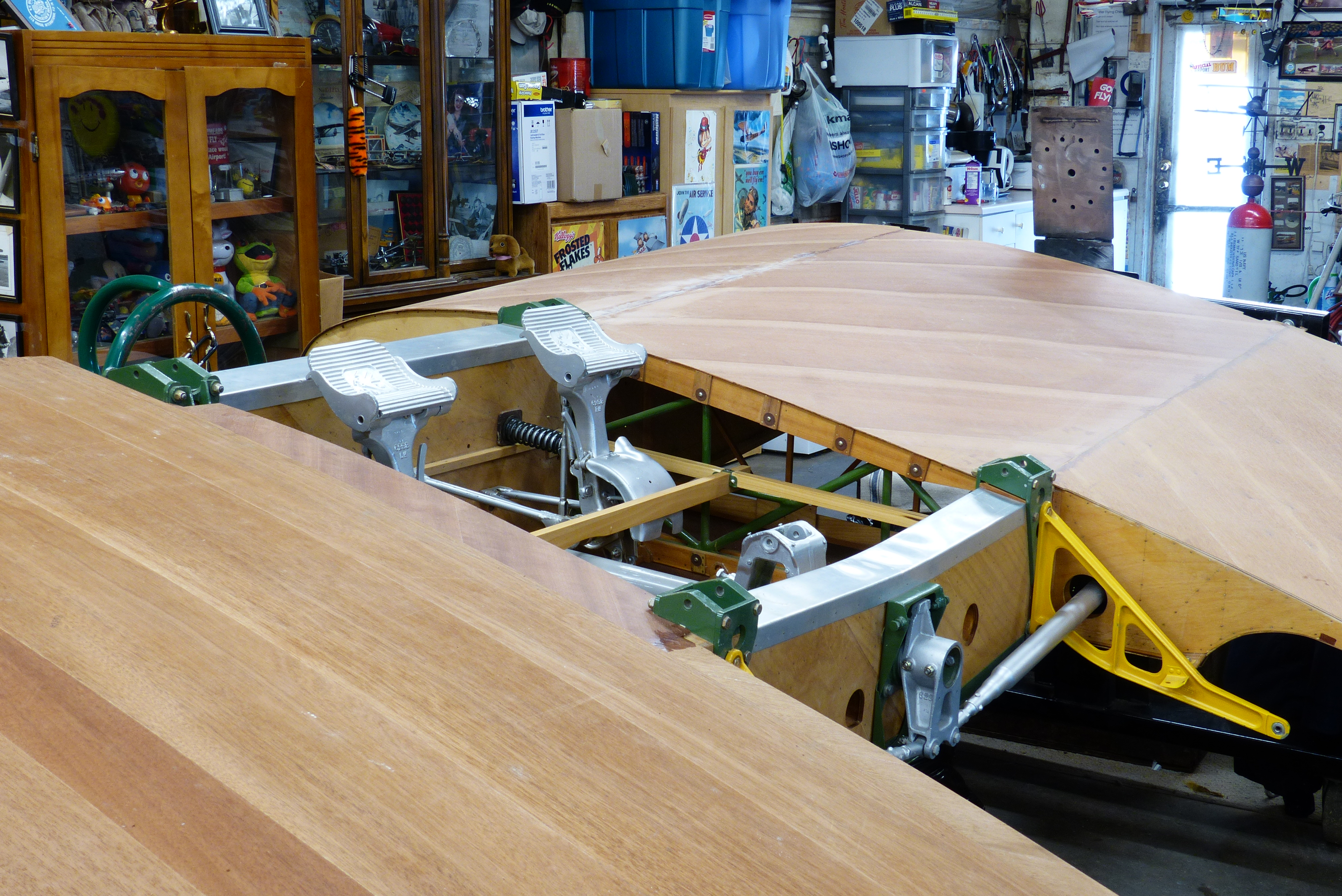
PT-19 plywood wing center section

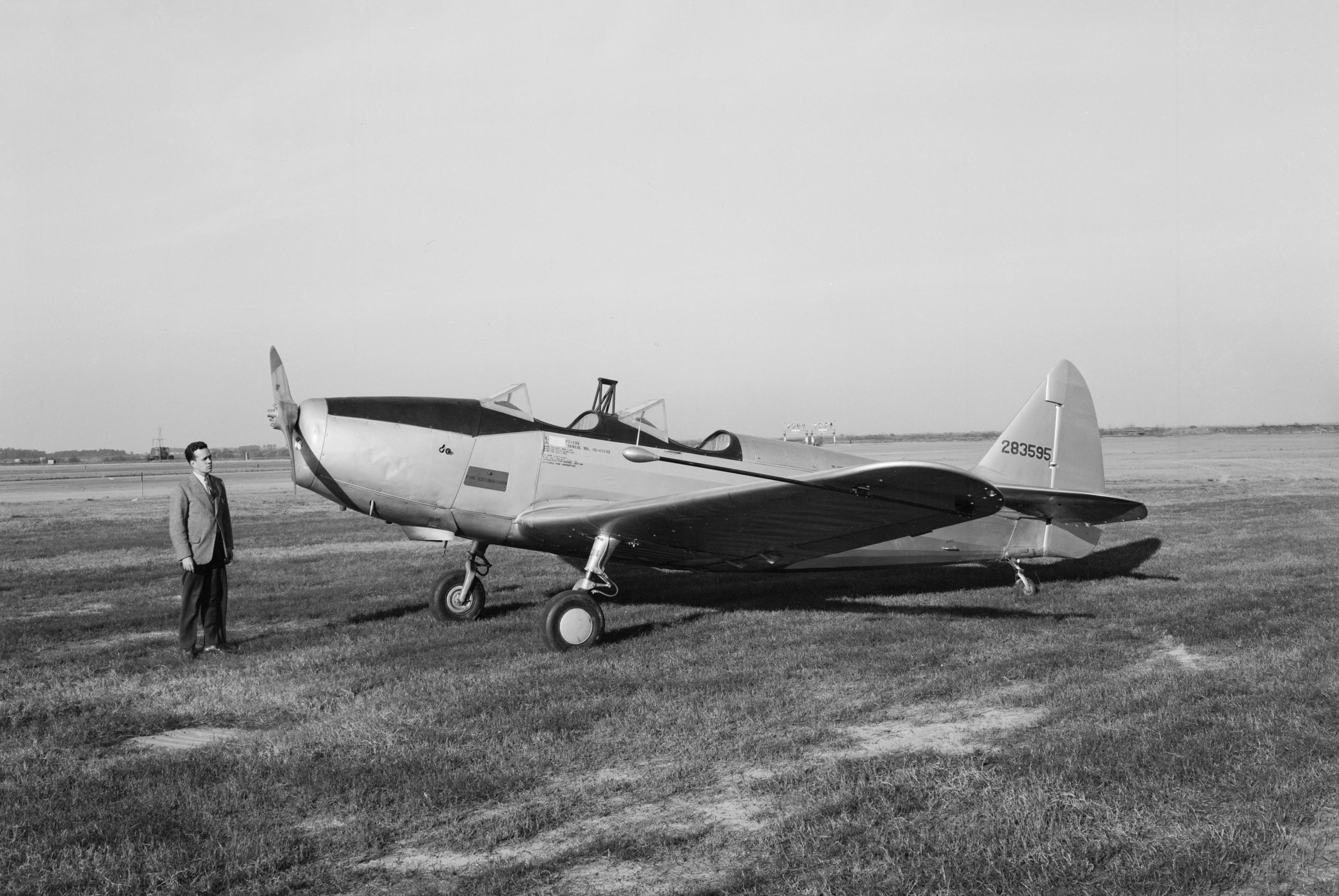
Fairchild PT-19

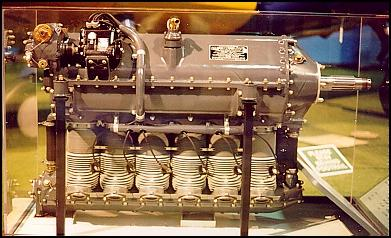
Fairchild Ranger L-440 engine

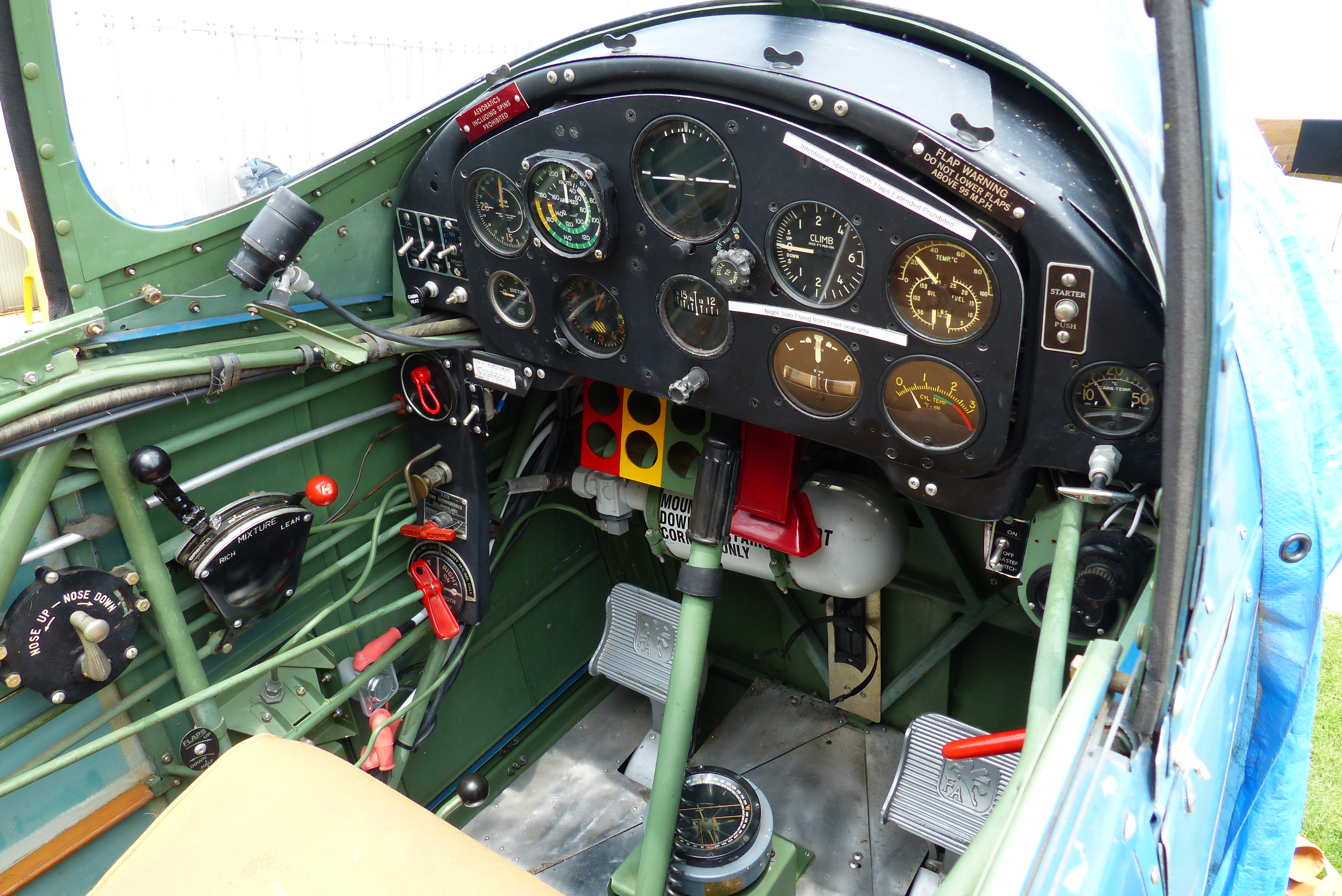
Commonwealth Forces cockpit, port side

On 15 May 1939, the M-62 prototype first flew. In a fly-off competition at Wright Field, the aircraft beat out 17 other designs. On 22 September 1939, the Army placed an order for 270 airplanes. Fairchild had to include 27 wood-working subcontractors, including furniture stores, a hosiery plant, and a foundry. After the start of World War II, Fairchild licensed manufacturing with Fleet Aircraft, Howard Aircraft Corporation, St. Louis Aircraft Corporation, and Aeronca Aircraft.

The original production batch of 275 was powered by the inline 175 hp Ranger L-440-1 engine and designated the PT-19. In 1941, mass production began and 3,181 of the PT-19A model, powered by the 200 hp L-440-3, were made by Fairchild. An additional 477 were built by Aeronca and 44 by the St. Louis Aircraft Corporation. The PT-19B, of which 917 were built, was equipped for instrument flight training by attaching a collapsible hood to the front cockpit.

When airplane production exceeded engine production, the PT-23 was prototyped by Fairchild. Except for the engine, the airplane was identical from the firewall rearwards. According to Puckett, "The second protype PT-23 was the only one of these airplanes which was painted Air Corps blue and yellow." The PT-23 was powered by the 220 hp Continental R-670 radial powerplant. A total of 869 PT-23s was built, as well as 256 of the PT-23A, which was the instrument flight-equipped version. The PT-23 was manufactured in the US by Fairchild, Aeronca, St. Louis Aircraft Corporation, and Howard Aircraft Corporation and in Canada by Fleet Aircraft Corporation, as well as Fabrica do Galeao in Brazil (220 or 232 between 1944 and 1948).

During 1943, USAAF Training Command received a number of complaints about durability issues with the plywood wings of the PT-19 and the PT-23 when exposed to the high heat and/or humidity of training bases located in Texas and Florida. Maintenance officers at the USAAF overhaul depots had been forced to order replacement of the wooden wing sections after only two to three months' active service because of wood rot and ply separation issues. Subsequent to this incident, the USAAF incorporated a demand for all-metal wing sections on all future fixed-wing training aircraft.

The final variant was the PT-26, which used the L-440-7 engine. The Canadian-built versions of these were designated the Cornell for use by the British Commonwealth Air Training Plan which was centered in Canada.

== Operational history ==
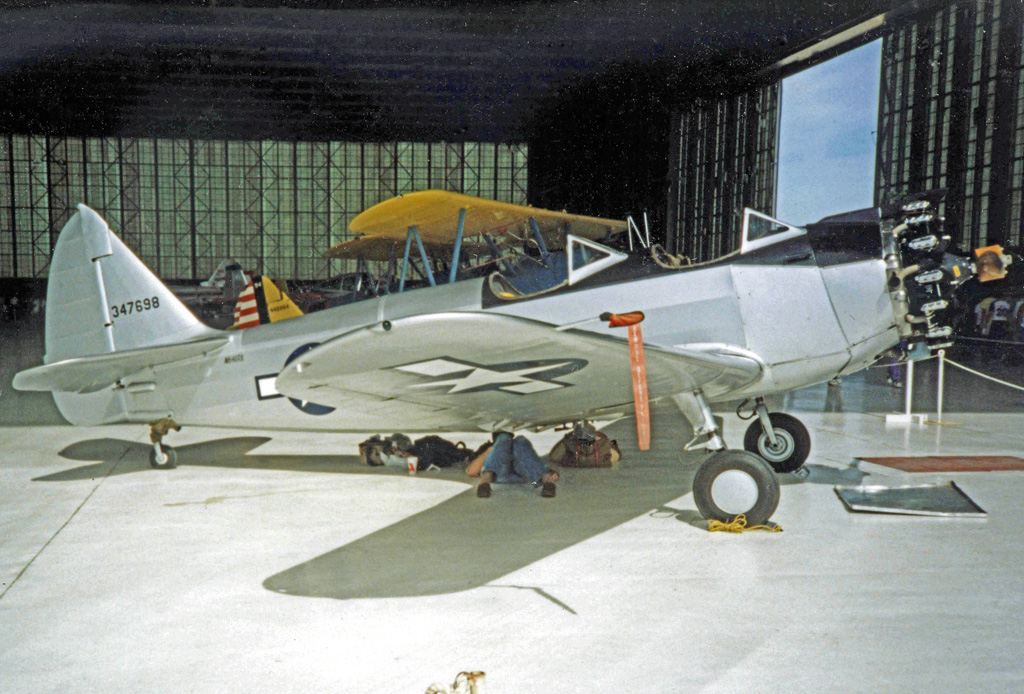
Radial engined PT-23 Cornell built by Aeronca, privately flown in 1990

Compared to the earlier biplane trainers, the Fairchild PT-19 provided a more advanced type of aircraft. Speeds were higher and wing loading more closely approximated that of combat aircraft, with flight characteristics demanding more precision and care. Its virtues were that it was inexpensive, simple to maintain, and most of all, virtually viceless.

These planes were delivered to various bases all over the country by Women's Airforce Service Pilots between 1942 and 1944.

Thousands of the PT-19 series were rapidly integrated into the United States and Commonwealth training programs, serving throughout World War II and beyond. Even after their retirement in the late 1940s, a substantial number found their way onto the United States and other civil registers, being flown by private pilot owners.

== Variants ==
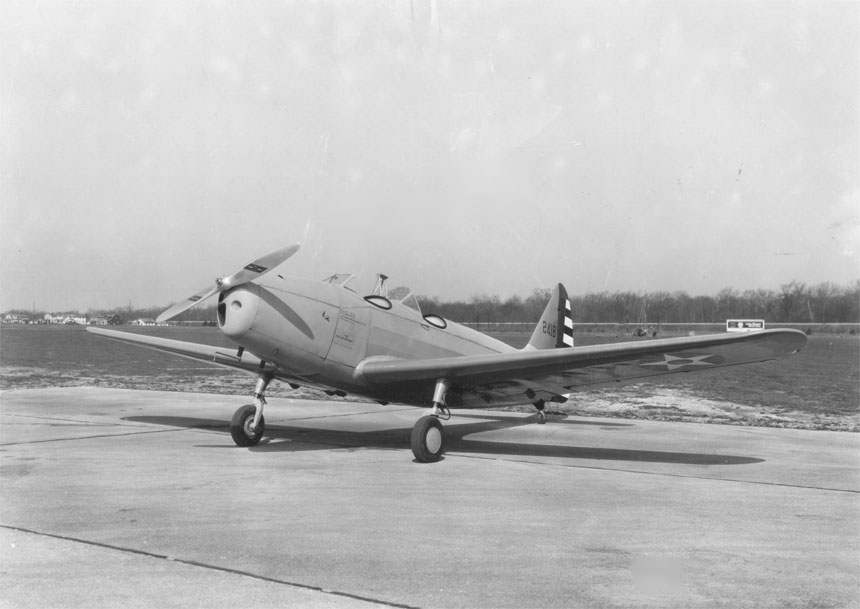
Fairchild PT-19 - Ranger L-440-1 engine (Aircraft # 40-2418)

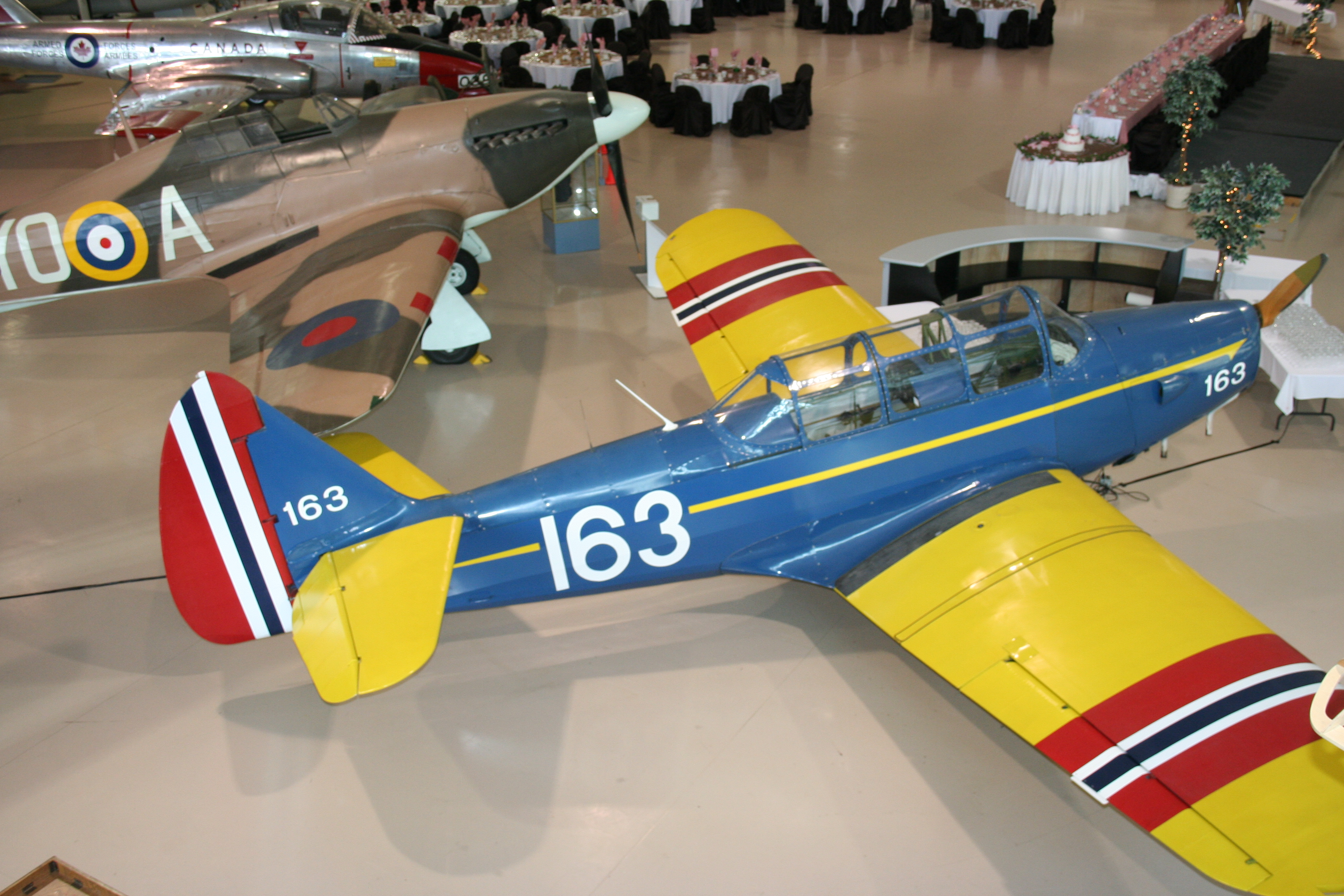
Fairchild PT-19 used in the Little Norway training camp, now at the Canadian Warplane Heritage Museum

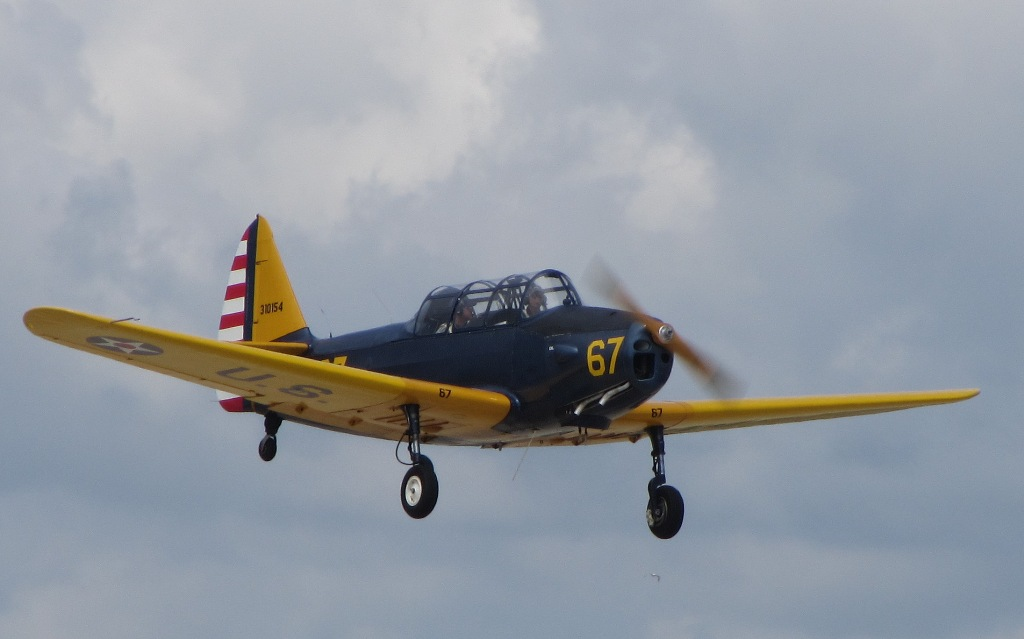

PT-19
Initial production variant of the Model M62 powered by 175 hp L-440-1, 270 built
PT-19A
As the PT-19 but powered by a 200 hp L-440-3 and detailed changes, redesignated T-19A in 1948, 3226 built
PT-19B
Instrument training version of the PT-19A, 143 built and six conversions from PT-19A
XPT-23A
A PT-19 re-engined with a 220 hp R-670-5 radial engine
PT-23
Production radial-engined version, 774 built
PT-23A
Instrument training version of the PT-23, 256 built
PT-26
PT-19A variant with enclosed cockpit for training in Canada under the British Commonwealth Air Training Plan, powered by a 200 hp L-440-3, 670 built for the Royal Canadian Air Force as the Cornell I
PT-26A
As PT-26 but with a 200hp L-440-7 engine, 807 built by Fleet as the Cornell II
PT-26B
As PT-26A with minor changes, 250 built as the Cornell III

== Operators ==
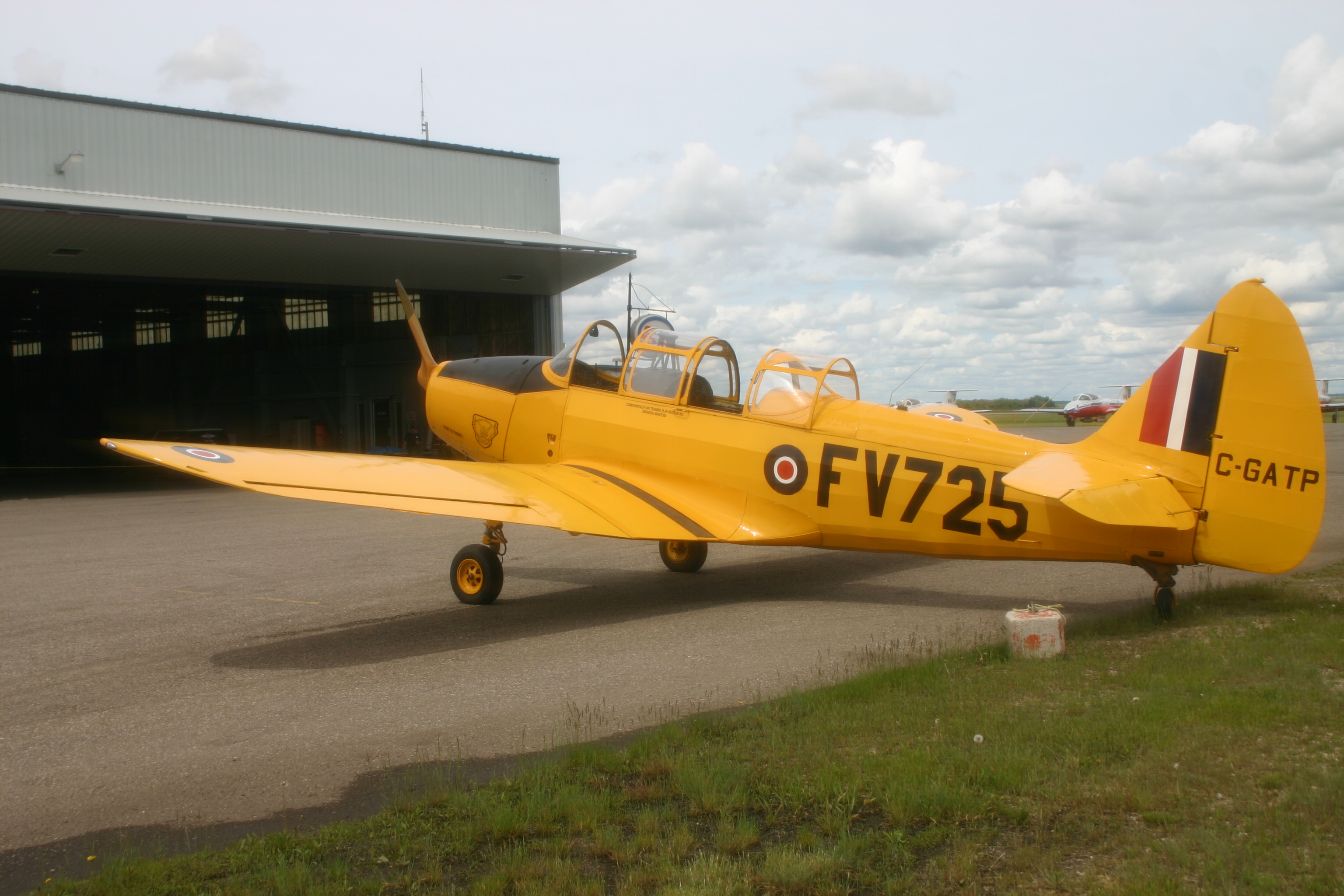
Fairchild PT-26B Cornell in flying condition at the Commonwealth Air Training Plan Museum, Brandon, Manitoba, 2005

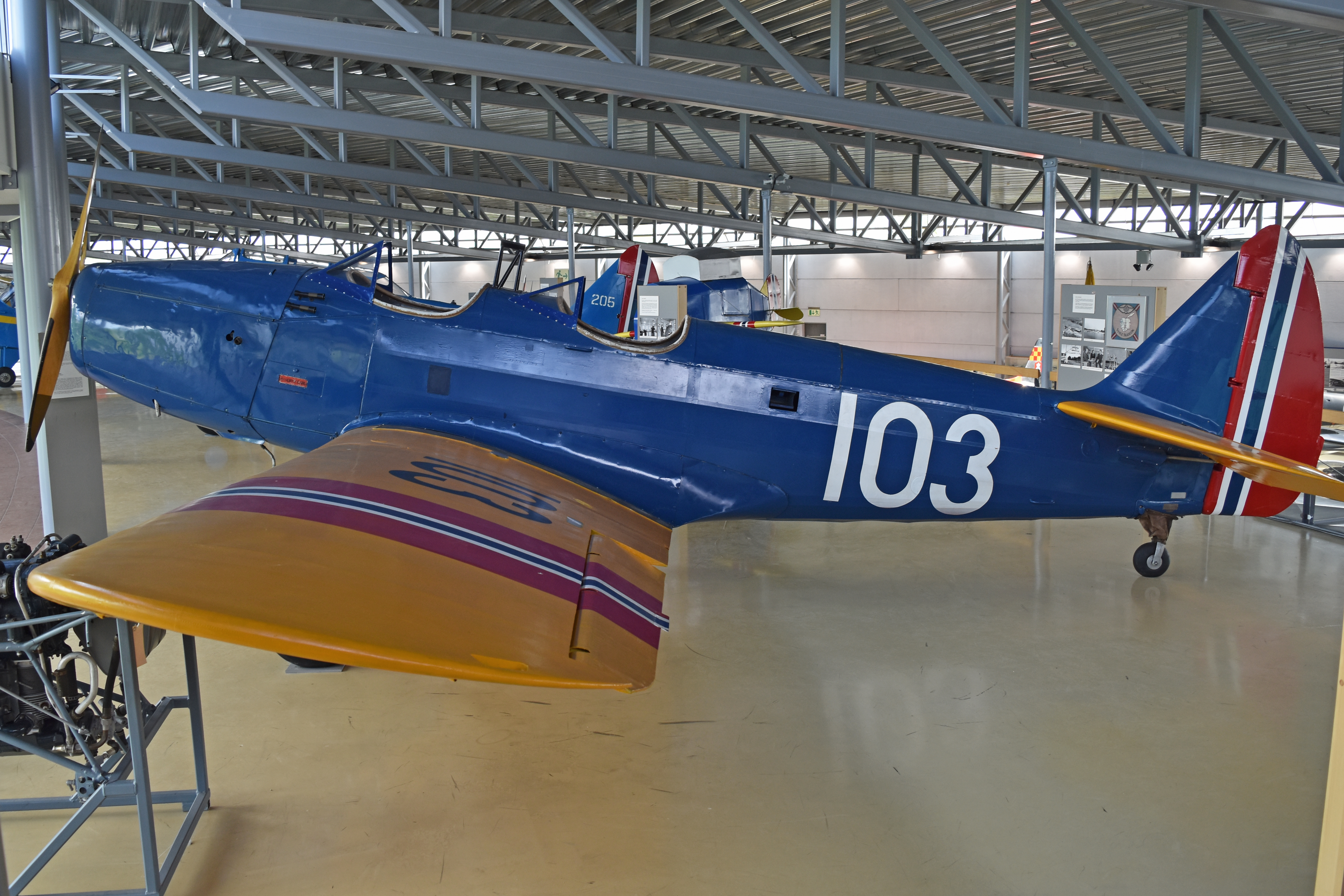
Fairchild PT-19 Cornell at Norway's Flysamlingen Forsvarets Museer (Norwegian Armed Forces Aircraft Collection): This model was built for Norway as training aircraft.

Brazil

- Brazilian Air Force

Canada

- Royal Canadian Air Force

Chile

- Chilean Air Force

China
Colombia

- Colombian Air Force

Ecuador

- Ecuadorian Air Force

El Salvador
Guatemala

- Guatemalan Air Force

Haiti

- Haiti Air Corps

Honduras

- Honduran Air Force - PT-23

India

- Indian Air Force

Mexico

- Mexican Air Force

Nicaragua

- Nicaraguan Air Force

Norway

- Royal Norwegian Air Force

Paraguay

- Paraguayan Air Arm received a few Fairchild M-62s in 1940, followed by 15 Lend-Lease PT-19A in 1942-43. In the 1950s, 14 ex-Brazilian Air Force PT-19s (PT-3FG built under license in Brazil) were received. The last PT-19 was retired in 1972.

Peru

- Peruvian Air Force

Philippines

- Philippines Air Force

South Africa

- South African Air Force

Southern Rhodesia

- Rhodesian Air Force

United Kingdom

- Royal Air Force - Norwegian Training Base at RAF Winkleigh

United States

- United States Army Air Corps/United States Army Air Forces

Uruguay

- Uruguayan Air Force received 17 PT-19As and PT-19Bs under Lend Lease in 1942, with 50 PT-26s being delivered in 1946–1947.
- Uruguayan Navy

Venezuela

- Aviación Militar received 20 PT-19As under Lend Lease.

== Surviving aircraft ==
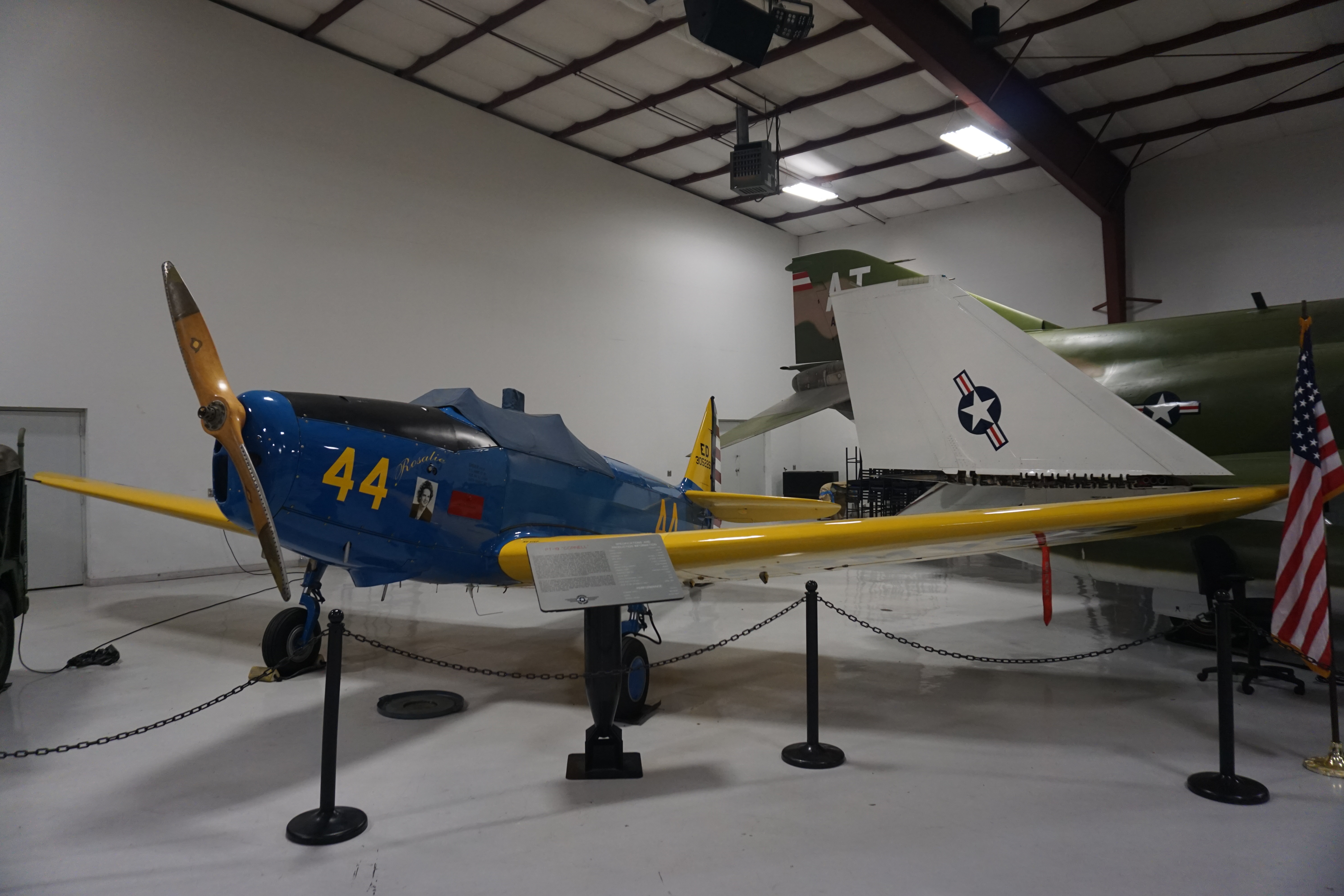
Fairchild PT-19 at the Cavanaugh Flight Museum

As of 2011, 98 aircraft remained airworthy worldwide.

- One example is found at the Travis Air Force Base Aviation Museum, Travis Air Force Base, Fairfield, California.
- Another is in storage at the Reynolds-Alberta Museum in Wetaskiwin, Alberta.
- Fairchild PT-26A-FE Cornell II 'N58799' is flying in the Netherlands.
- Fairchild PT-19A (283435) is flying in Alabama with the Birmingham Escadrille of the Commemorative Air Force after a 22-year restoration started in 1986.
- Fairchild PT-19 (42-34382) is maintained in flying condition by Butler County Warbirds military history museum in Middletown, Ohio.

== Specifications (PT-19A) ==
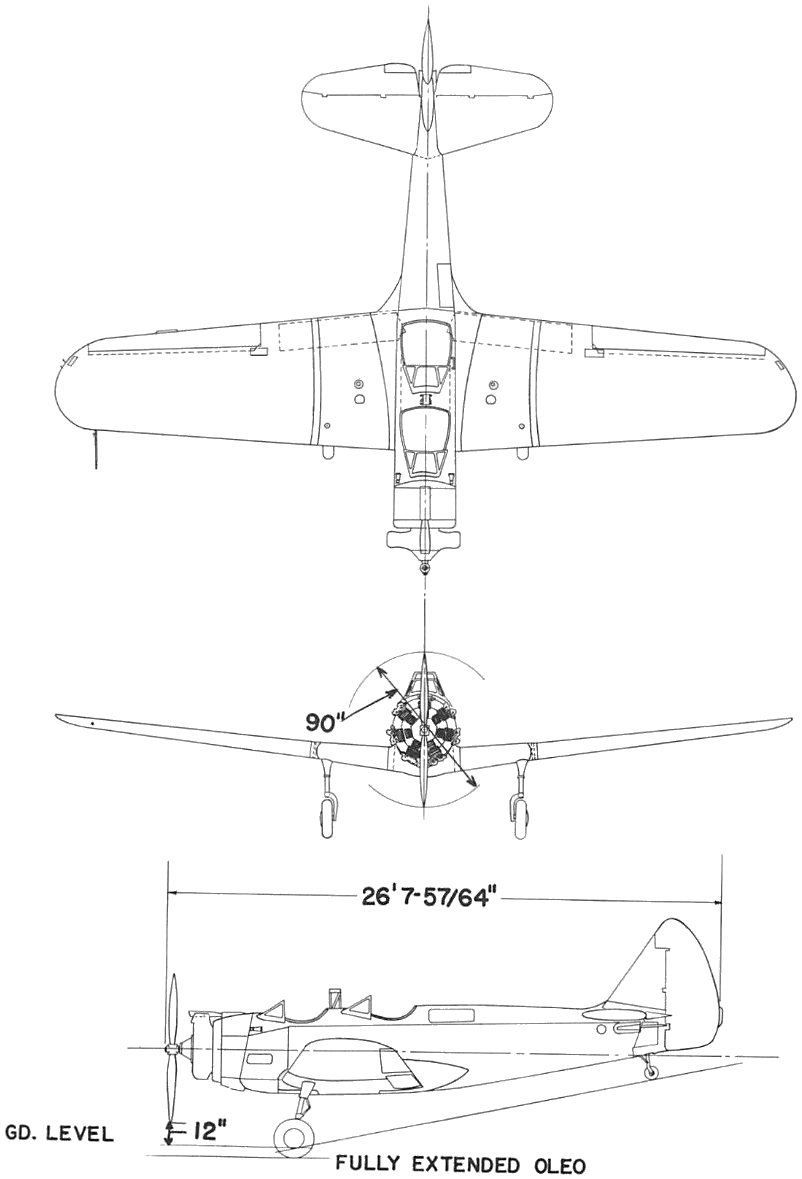
3-view line drawing of the Fairchild PT-23

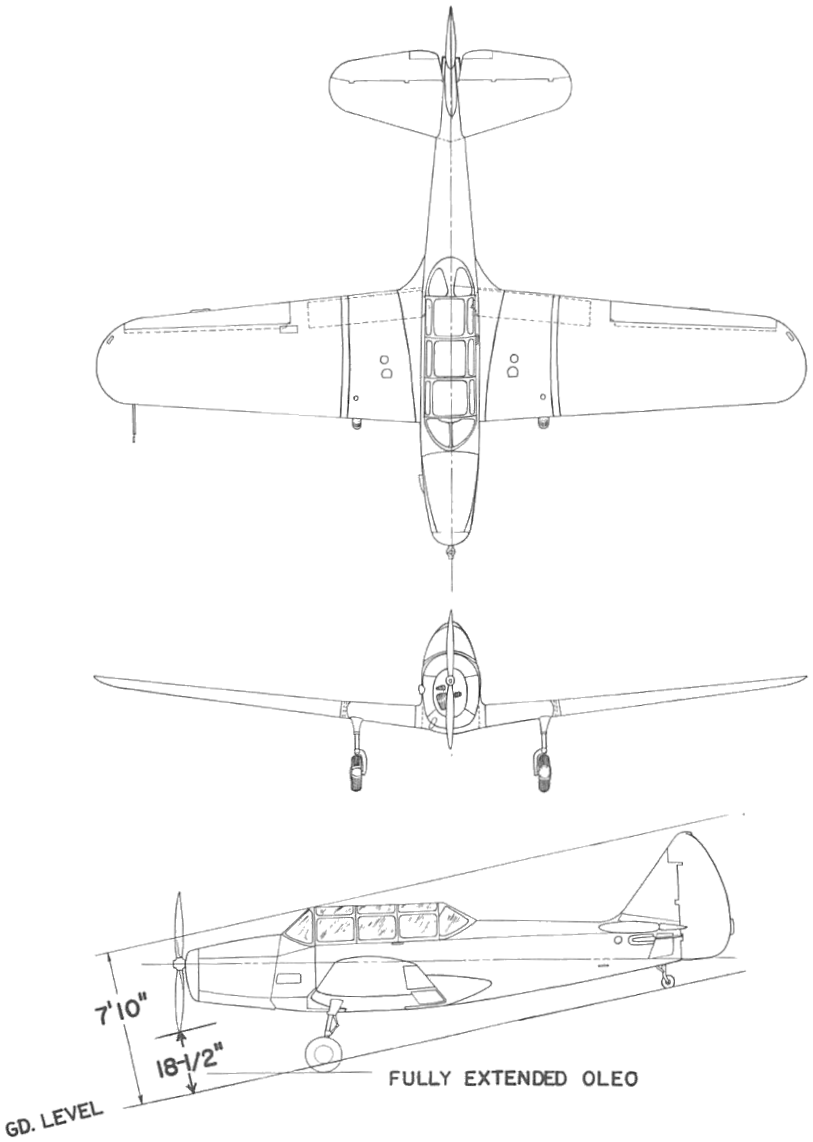
3-view line drawing of the Fairchild PT-26

Data from United States Military Aircraft since 1909

General characteristics

- Crew: two (pilot, student)
- Length: 28 ft 0 in (8.53 m)
- Wingspan: 36 ft 0 in (10.97 m)
- Height: 10 ft 6 in (3.20 m)
- Wing area: 200 sq ft (19 m^{2})
- Empty weight: 1,845 lb (837 kg)
- Gross weight: 2,545 lb (1,154 kg)
- Powerplant: 1 × Ranger L-440-3 6-cyl. inverted air-cooled in-line piston engine, 200 hp (150 kW)

Performance

- Maximum speed: 115 kn (132 mph, 212 km/h)
- Range: 350 nmi (400 mi, 640 km)
- Service ceiling: 15,300 ft (4,700 m)
- Time to altitude: 17.5 min to 10,000 feet (3,000 m)

== See also ==
Aircraft of comparable role, configuration, and era

- de Havilland Canada DHC-1 Chipmunk
- Miles Magister
- Sea Teziutlán
- Yakovlev UT-2

Related lists

- Lists of military aircraft of the United States
- List of most-produced aircraft
