= ENAER =

Chilean aircraft manufacturer

Empresa Nacional de Aeronáutica de Chile
- Company type: State-owned company
- Industry: Aerospace, Defense
- Predecessor: Maestranza Central de Aviación
- Founded: March 16, 1984; 42 years ago
- Headquarters: Santiago, Santiago, Santiago, Chile
- Area served: Latin America
- Products: Military aircraft
- Services: Aircraft maintenance Aircraft MLU systems
- Owner: Chilean Air Force
- Website: www.enaer.cl

ENAER (Spanish pronunciation: [enaˈeɾ]) (Empresa Nacional de Aeronáutica de Chile, "National Aeronautical Company of Chile") is a Chilean aircraft manufacturer.

== History ==
The origins of ENAER can be traced back to 1930, when the Chilean Air Force formed a dedicated maintenance wing, the Maestranza Central de Aviación (Central Aviation Workshop). During 1980, the Chilean Air Force established an aircraft manufacturing arm, IndAer. During the early 1980s, an agreement with Piper Aircraft saw IndAer begin the local assembly of the firm's PA-28 Dakotas for the Chilean Air Force. Around the same period, it also started building the ENAER T-35 Pillán, a military light trainer, which was developed for manufacture in Chile by Piper, based on a PA-32R fuselage with a new center-section and wing stressed for aerobatics. The first production aircraft was delivered by ENAER to the Chilean Air Force Air Academy in August 1985.

On 16 March 1984, IndAer was reorganised as a state-owned company separate to the Chilean Air force, named ENAER (Empresa Nacional de Aeronáutica de Chile, "National Aeronautical Company of Chile"). The Chilean Air Force initially provided the company with capital, personnel and resources, while one of the firm's prime responsibilities was to service the various aircraft types operated by the Chilean Air Force.

During the 1980s, the Chilean Air Force acquired four Spanish-built CASA C-101 trainer aircraft, along with a licensing agreement for another eight to be assembled locally by ENAER. In Chilean service, the type is designated as the T-36 Halcón. A follow-on agreement for a dedicated attack version of the C-101, which was locally designated as the A-36 Halcón ("Falcon"), was also ordered by Chile; only the prototype was manufactured in Spain, while the remaining 22 machines were assembled by ENAER. Modifications over the trainer model previously procured included an engine upgrade and increased fuel capacity.

During 1986, ENAER decided to embark on its first entirely indigenous aircraft. It was a two-seat, single-engined light aircraft suitable for use by flying clubs as a training aircraft. As such, the project, initially known as the Avion Livano (light aircraft) and later known as the Ñamcú, was to be inexpensive, with a price of US$70,000 claimed in 1991. The first prototype made its maiden flight in April 1989, with three more prototypes following, one of which had a fatal crash on 11 February 1992.

After attempts to interest the Chilean Air Force in the Ñamcú failed, ENAER set up Euro-ENAER, a joint venture with the Delft University of Technology and private Dutch investors, to certify the aircraft as airworthy in the Netherlands under European regulations; ENAER hoped to sell as many as 50 aircraft per year, at a price which had increased to US$100,000 per aircraft. By 1998, it was planned to assemble a modified version of the aircraft, powered by a 150 hp (110 kW) Textron Lycoming O-320-D2A engine, in a new factory in the Netherlands. Certification was expected by late that year, while the unit price had again risen to $120,000. In early 1999, Euro-ENAER blamed poor weather and difficulties with the Joint Aviation Authorities for certification delays, while the unit price rose yet again to US$160,000, although the company was forecasting annual sales of 50 aircraft per year in Europe and 200 per year in America. Euro-ENAER certified the aircraft in 2001, but the company announced that additional funding was needed to start production. Financing could not be found, however, thus Euro-ENAER was declared bankrupt later that year.

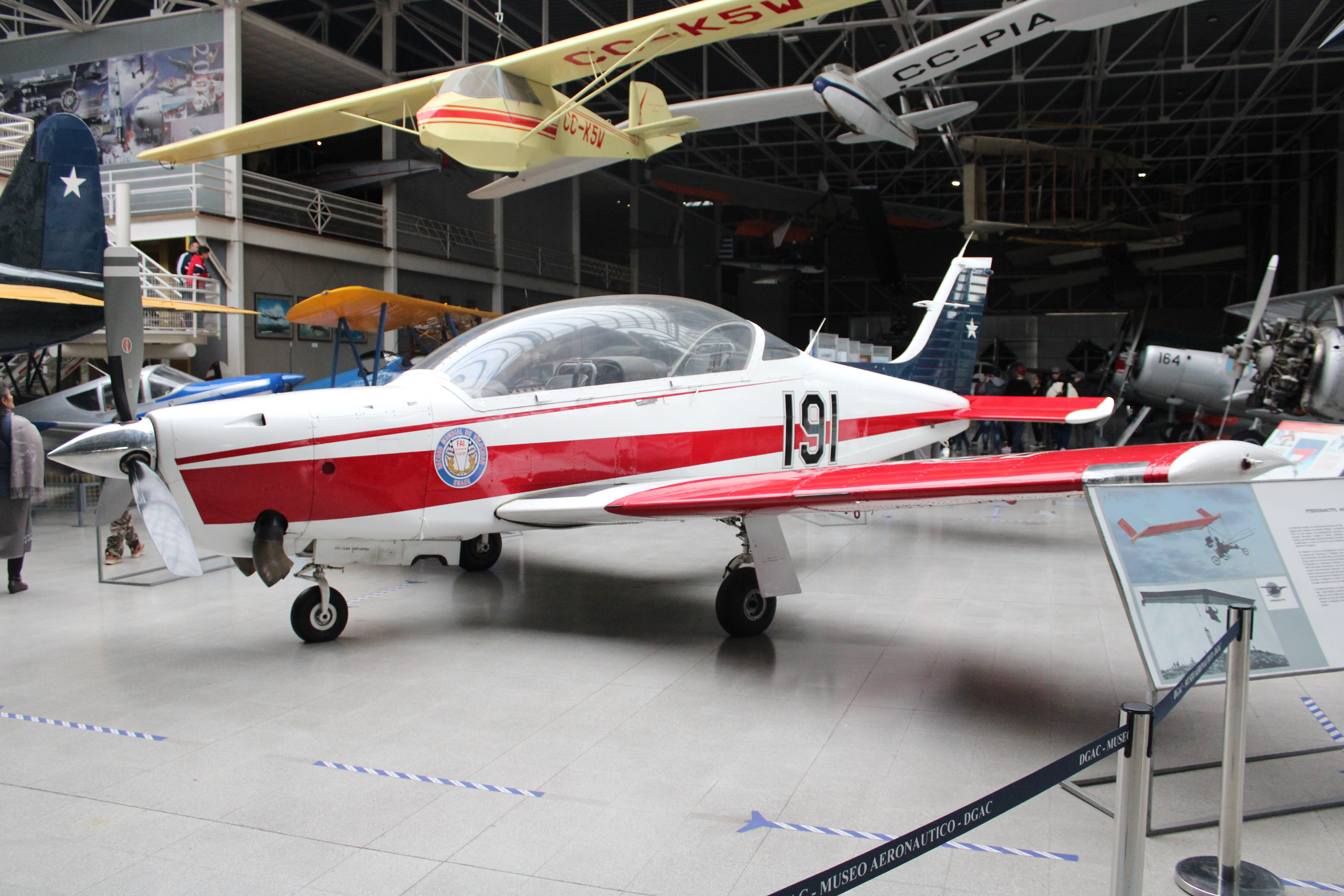
ENAER T-35 Pillán

== Aircraft ==
- Maestranza Central de Aviacion HF XX-02
- A-36 Halcón
- T-35 Pillán
- ENAER Elkan
- ENAER Pantera
- ENAER Ñamcú
- ENAER Eaglet
