= St. Louis CG-5 =

CG-5

General information
- Type: Military transport Glider
- National origin: United States
- Manufacturer: St. Louis Aircraft Corporation
- Number built: 1

History
- First flight: 1942

The St. Louis CG-5 was a 1940s American prototype military transport glider designed and built by the St. Louis Aircraft Corporation.

== Development ==
In 1941 the United States Army Air Force decided to use secondary sources to boost aircraft production and the St. Louis Aircraft Corporation was contracted to design and build a prototype of both an eight-seat and fifteen-seat troop carrying glider. In total with the St. Louis examples, eight prototypes were ordered from different aircraft manufacturers.

The model SL-5 eight seat glider was given the military designation CG-5 and the prototype designated XCG-5. Howard C. Blosom test flew the XCG-5 from Lambert Field in 1942. It proved to have serious aerodynamic flaws and structural problems causing Dutch Roll at speed. The heavier fifteen-seat glider (designated the XCG-6) was not built.

The USAAF ordered the Waco CG-3 for the eight/nine seat requirement, although only 100 were built. The fifteen-seat requirement was met by the Waco CG-4 of which more than 13,000 were built.

== Specifications (CG-5) ==
Data from skyways

General characteristics

- Crew: 2
- Capacity: 6
- Wingspan: 89 ft (27 m)
- Gross weight: 3,800 lb (1,724 kg)

Performance

- Never exceed speed: 110 kn (130 mph, 200 km/h) (experienced Dutch roll at max speed)

== See also ==
Aircraft of comparable role, configuration, and era

- Frankfort XCG-1
- Waco CG-3
- Bowlus XCG-7

Related lists

- List of World War II military gliders
