= Ranger L-440 =

Type of aircraft engine

L-440
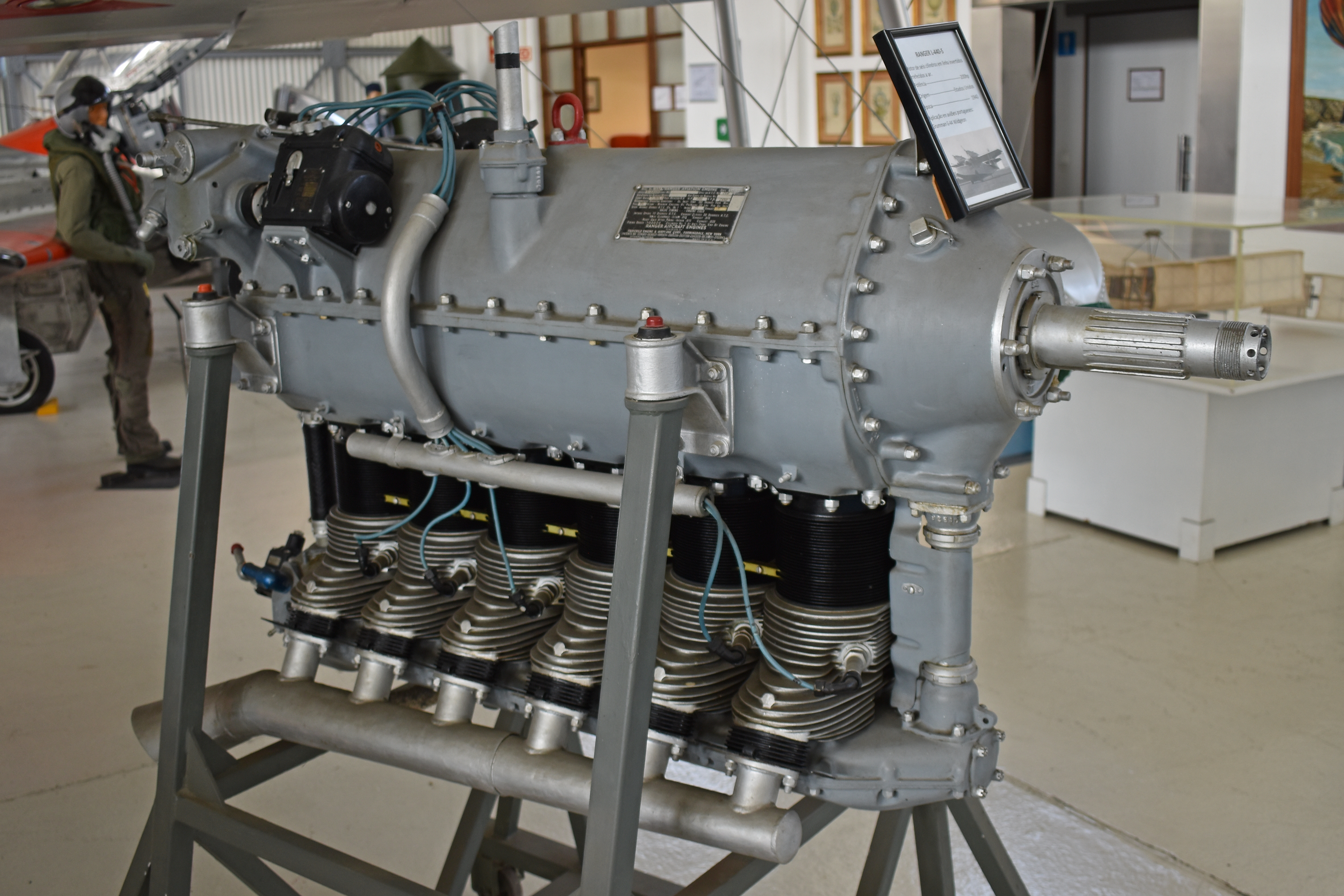
- A Ranger 6-440C-5 on display at the Museu do Ar, Portugal
- Type: Piston aero-engine
- Manufacturer: Ranger Aircraft Engine Division
- Major applications: Fairchild PT-19/PT-26; Grumman Widgeon

The Ranger L-440 (company designation 6-440C) are six-cylinder inline inverted air-cooled aero-engines produced by the Ranger Aircraft Engine Division of the Fairchild Engine and Airplane Corporation of Farmingdale, New York, United States. The engine was mainly produced for Fairchild's family of training aircraft in the mid-1930s.

== Design ==
According to H. L. Puckett, “Ranger developed a system of air-cooling that kept all cylinders at a high degree of uniformity. The system used pressurized air admitted through an opening in the front of the engine cowling, which then traveled through a tunnel connected to the air scoop.” The tunnel, with one side fitted with corrugations, directed the air against the cylinders at relatively equal pressure and volume. Baffles between the cylinders directed the air past machined cooling fins around the cylinder barrels and heads. This gave remarkably balanced temperature range in level flight..."

The Chromoly crankshaft with moveable counterweights on the rear to control torsional vibration. According to Puckett, "All main journals and crankpins are hollow for lightness and so that they may serve as oil reservoirs. Oil passages from the main bearings to the connecting rod bearings are drilled in each crankcheck so that each rod bearing is fed by two oil passages. The crankshaft is drilled so that excess oil from the main bearings is forced into the hollow journal and thence through tubes in the crankchecks to hollow crank pins." The crankcase is made of aluminum alloy.

Ranger manufactured the cylinder barrels from rough alloy steel forgings, while the pistons were machined from aluminum alloy castings, and the connecting rods were machined from chromoly steel forgings. The alloy steel forging camshaft was bolted to the cylinder heads, and driven by a vertical drive shaft.

Oil pumps, scavenge and pressure, were provided for engine oil distribution and return, as well as an oil cooler. Two Bendix-Scintilla magnetos were standard, with the left one incorporating impulse coupling. Also standard was a Stromberg carburetor, and either an electric or manual starter. Generators were either made by Ranger or Bendix, though the PT-26 used a wind driven generator.

== Variants ==
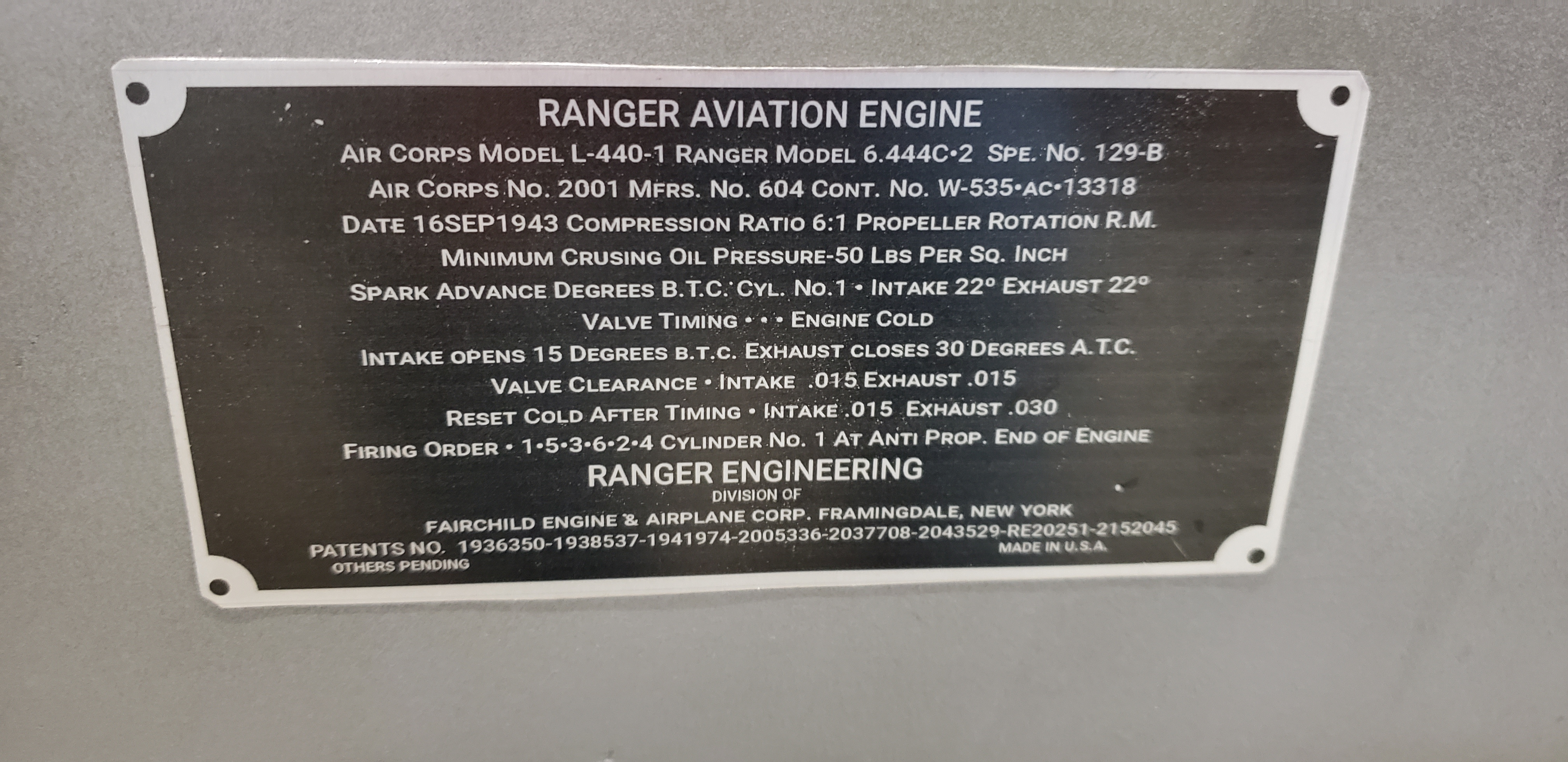
Ranger L-440-1 Model 6.444C-2 engine plate

=== Company ===
6-440C-2
175 hp (130 kW) variant with a 6:1 compression ratio.
6-440C-3
180 hp (130 kW) variant with a 6.2:1 compression ratio.
6-440C-4
190 hp (140 kW) variant with a 6.8:1 compression ratio.
6-440C-5
200 hp (150 kW) variant with a 7.5:1 compression ratio.

=== Military ===
L-440-1
Military designation of the 6-440C-2
L-440-2
Military designation of the 6-440C-5
L-440-3
Military designation of the 6-440C-5
L-440-5
Military designation of the 6-440C-5
L-440-7
Military designation of the 6-440C-5
L-440-9
Military designation of the 6-440C-2
L-440-11
Military designation of the 6-440C-5

== Applications ==
- Fairchild 24
- Fairchild PT-19/26
- Falconar SAL Mustang
- Grumman Widgeon
- Maestranza Central de Aviación HF XX-02
- St. Louis PT-LM-4

== Specifications (6-440C-2) ==
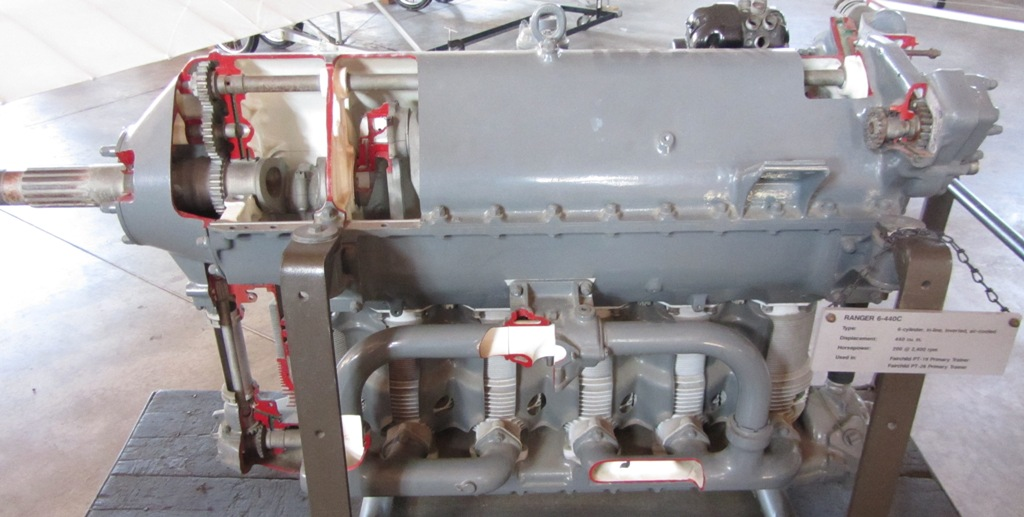
A 6-440C cutaway

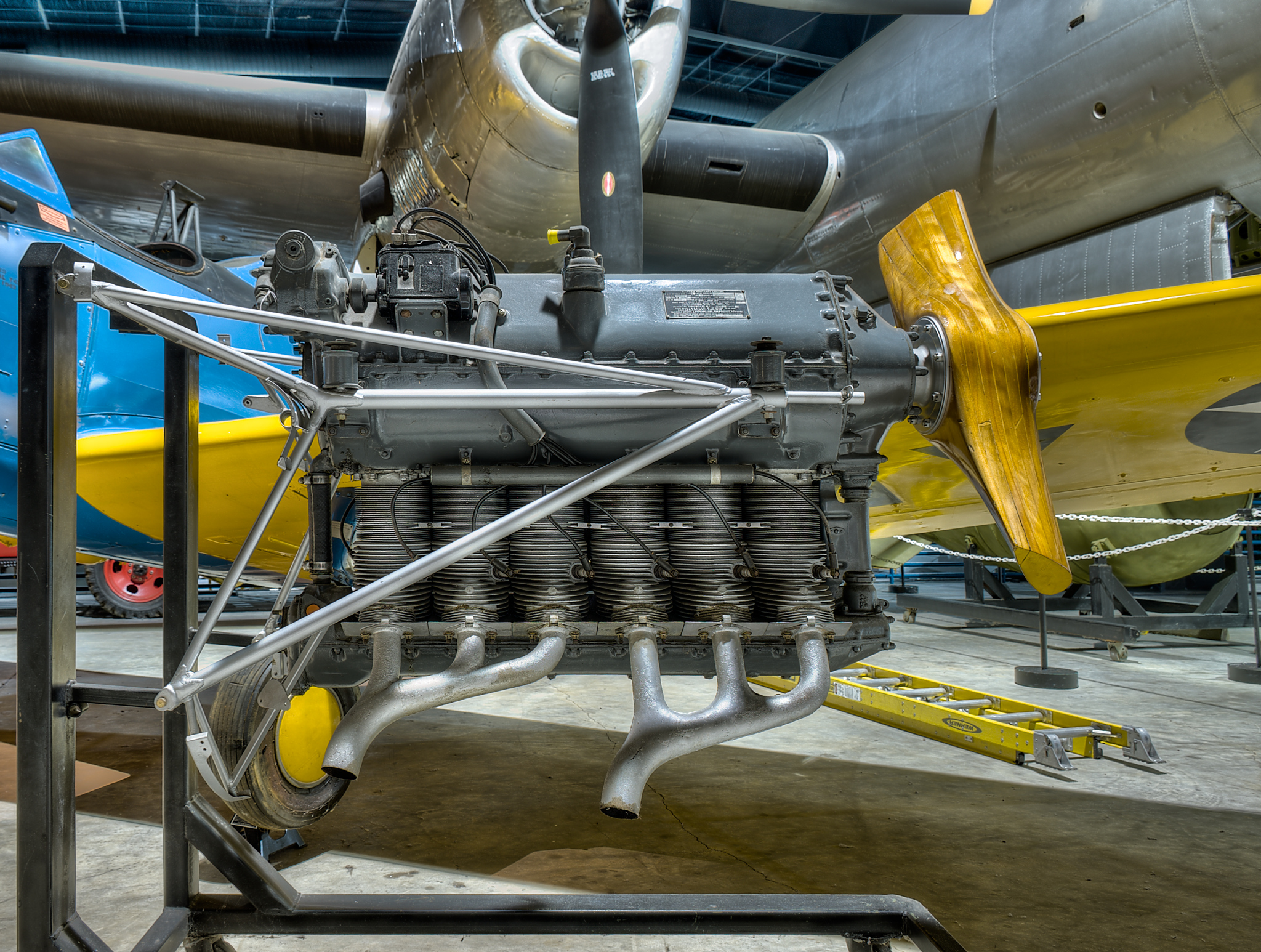
L-440 on display at Museum of Aviation, Robins AFB

Data from

=== General characteristics ===
- Type: Six-cylinder inline inverted air-cooled
- Bore: 4 1/8 in (104.8 mm)
- Stroke: 5 1/2 in (139.7 mm)
- Displacement: 441 in^{3} (7.2 litres)
- Length: 53.156 in (1.351 m)
- Width: 21.954 in (0.549 m)
- Height: 33.50 in (0.854 m)
- Dry weight: 376 lb (171 kg)

=== Components ===
- Valvetrain: Overhead camshaft
- Fuel system: Updraft carburetor
- Fuel type: 65 octane rating gasoline
- Oil system: Full pressure type
- Cooling system: air-cooled (pressure type cylinder baffles)

=== Performance ===
- Power output: 175 hp (130 kW) at 2,450 rpm
- Compression ratio: 6:1

== See also ==
Comparable engines

- de Havilland Gipsy Six
- Menasco B6
- Napier Javelin

Related lists

- List of aircraft engines
