= ENAER T-35 Pillán =

Chilean trainer aircraft class

T-35 Pillán
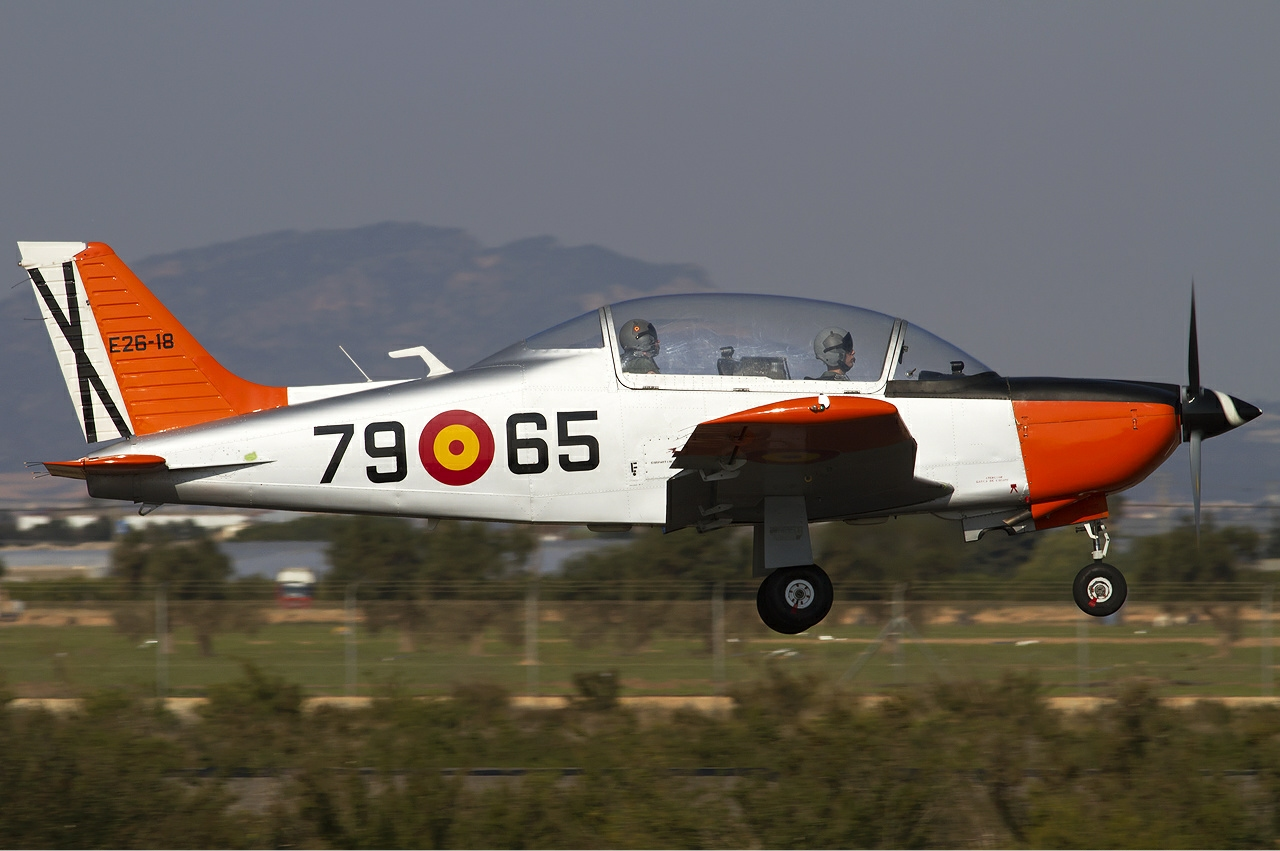
- An ENAER T-35 Pillán of the Spanish Air and Space Force

General information
- Type: Trainer
- National origin: Chile
- Manufacturer: ENAER
- Status: In service
- Primary users: Chilean Air Force Spanish Air and Space Force; National Air and Naval Service of Panama; Paraguayan Air Force
- Number built: 154

History
- Manufactured: 28 December 1984 – 1991
- First flight: 6 March 1981
- Developed from: Piper PA-32R

ENAER T-35 Pillán (Spanish pronunciation: [piˈʎan], Mapudungún: volcano or ancestral spirit) is a Chilean propeller-driven basic trainer aircraft. The student and the instructor sit in tandem. Production ceased in 1991 after 7 years but restarted briefly in 1998.

== Design and development ==
Prior to the eighties Chile possessed a decrepit fleet of military trainers obtained under the Mutual Defense Assistance Act. However, these trainers had become exceedingly difficult to repair following passage of a US arms embargo in 1976. The PA-28R-300 Pillán was developed by Piper Aircraft in the United States as a two-seat military trainer for assembly in Chile, based on a PA-32R fuselage with a new center-section and wing stressed for aerobatics. The first prototype designated XBT first flew at Lakeland on 6 March 1981 and was followed by a second prototype, designated YBT. The second prototype first flew on 31 August 1981 and was then delivered to Chile. The prototype XBT was delivered to Chile in January 1982 but was written off on 10 March 1982. Production of kits at Vero Beach Municipal Airport commenced with three pre-production kits which were delivered for assembly in Chile in 1982, Vero Beach then produced 120 kits for assembly in Chile for the Chilean and Spanish Air Force. The first production aircraft was delivered by ENAER to the Chilean Air Force Air Academy in August 1985. The Spanish aircraft were assembled in Spain by CASA.

Apart from a few turbine powered aircraft, all Pilláns were powered by a 300 hp (224 kW) Textron Lycoming AEIO-540-K1K5 six cylinder horizontally opposed piston engine.

In 1985 a turboprop variant was developed by ENAER as the T-35A Aucan. In early 1986 one of the piston-engined pre-production aircraft was sent to Soloy Aviation Solutions in the United States for modification to install a 420 shp Allison 250B-17D engine.

== Variants ==
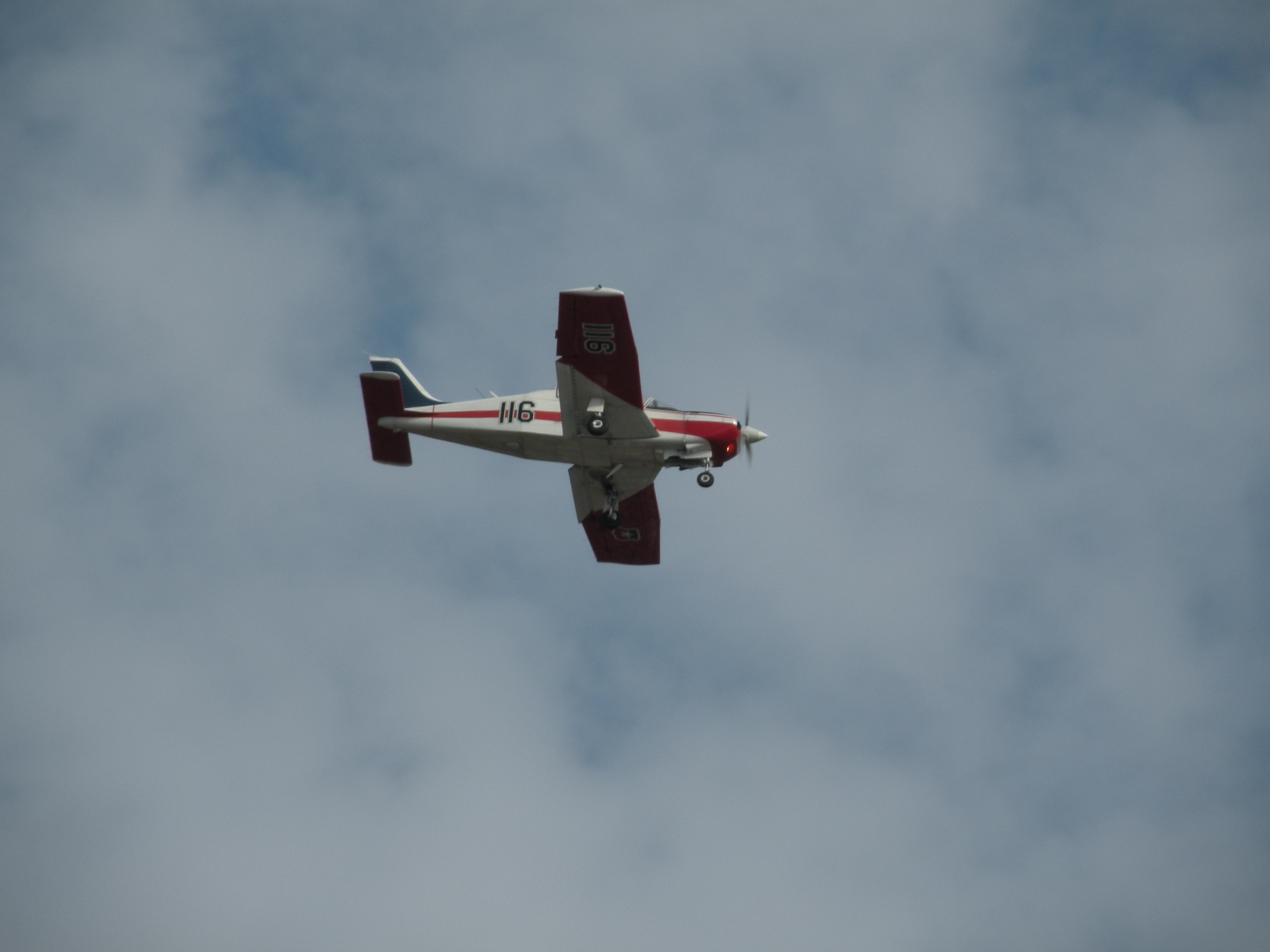
ENAER T-35 Pillan of the Chilean Air Force

Piper PA-28R-300 Pillan
Two Piper built prototypes.
T-35A
Two-seat primary training aircraft for the Chilean Air Force. 60 delivered by 1990.
T-35B
Two-seat instrument training aircraft for the Chilean Air Force. 20 delivered by 1990.
T-35C
Two-seat primary training aircraft for the Spanish Air and Space Force, known as the E.26 Tamiz. 41 delivered by 1987.
T-35D
Two-seat primary and instrument training aircraft for Panama and Paraguay.
T-35DT
Turboprop powered version, powered by a 420-ehp (313-kW) Allison 250-B17D turboprop engine. Original designation T-35XT.
T-35S
Single-seat aerobatic aircraft.
T-35T Aucan
Improved turboprop powered version.
Pillan 2000
Proposed (1998) updated version of the T-35 Pillan with new wing.

== Operators ==
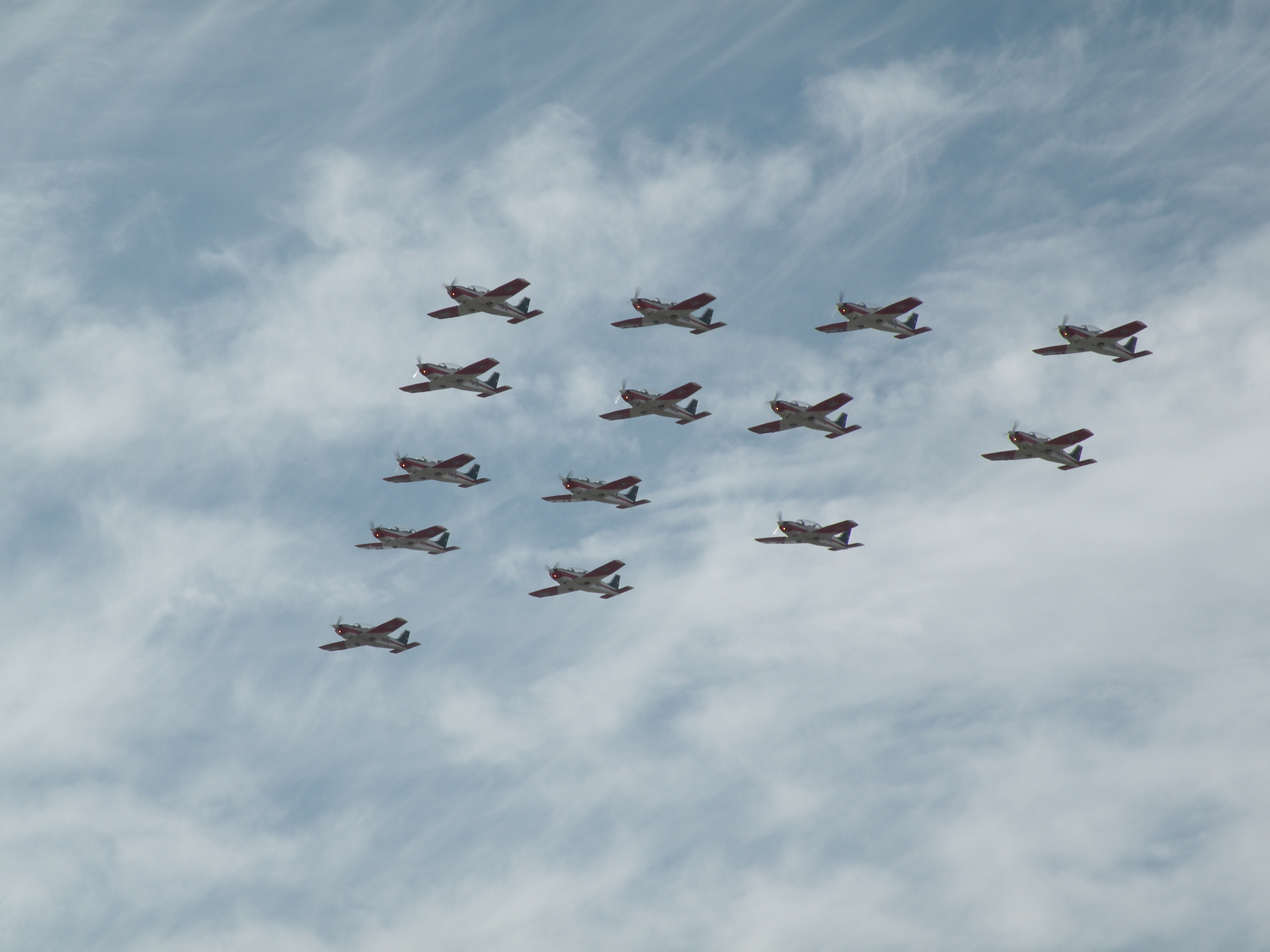
A T-35 Pillán formation of Chilean Air Force above Santiago, 2009.

Chile

- Chilean Air Force operates 31 aircraft as of 2017.

Dominican Republic

- Dominican Air Force operates four aircraft as of 2017.

Ecuador

- Ecuadorian Navy – operates three as of 2017.

El Salvador

- Salvadoran Air Force – operates three as of 2017.

Guatemala

- Guatemalan Air Force – operates four as of 2017.

Panama

- National Air and Naval Service of Panama – operates four as of 2017.

Paraguay

- Paraguayan Air Force – operates 9 as of 2017.

== Former operators ==
Spain

- Spanish Air and Space Force – ordered 41, all retired, 7 sold to Dominican Republic, replaced by Pilatus PC-21.

== Specifications (T-35A) ==
Data from Jane's all the World's Aircraft 1988–89

General characteristics

- Crew: 2
- Length: 8 m (26 ft 3 in)
- Wingspan: 8.84 m (29 ft 0 in)
- Height: 2.64 m (8 ft 8 in)
- Wing area: 13.69 m^{2} (147.4 sq ft)
- Airfoil: root: NACA 65_{2}-415; tip: NACA 65_{2}-415 modified
- Empty weight: 930 kg (2,050 lb) equipped
- Max takeoff weight: 1,338 kg (2,950 lb) (and Maximum Landing Weight)

1,315 kg (2,899 lb) aerobatic

- Fuel capacity: 291.5 L (77.0 US gal; 64.1 imp gal) in two wing leading edge integral tanks / 210 kg (463 lb) (272.5 L (72.0 US gal; 59.9 imp gal) usable)
- Powerplant: 1 × Avco Lycoming AEIO-540-K1K5 6-cylinder air-cooled horizontally-opposed piston engine, 224 kW (300 hp)
- Propellers: 3-bladed Hartzell HC-C3YR-4BF/FC7663R, 1.93 m (6 ft 4 in) diameter constant-speed propeller

Performance

- Maximum speed: 311 km/h (193 mph, 168 kn) at sea level
- Cruise speed: 266 km/h (165 mph, 144 kn) 75% power at 2,680 m (8,793 ft)

255 km/h (158 mph; 138 kn) 55% power at 5,120 m (16,798 ft)

- Stall speed: 125 km/h (78 mph, 67 kn) flaps up

115 km/h (71 mph; 62 kn) flaps down

- Maximum flap extension speed: 218 km/h (135 mph; 118 kn)
- Maximum undercarriage extension speed: 256 km/h (159 mph; 138 kn)
- Approach speed over 15 m (49 ft) obstacle: 148 km/h (92 mph; 80 kn)
- Landing speed: 120 km/h (75 mph; 65 kn)
- Never exceed speed: 446 km/h (277 mph, 241 kn)
- Range: 1,093 km (679 mi, 590 nmi) 75% power at 2,440 m (8,005 ft) (45 minutes reserve)

1,204 km (748 mi; 650 nmi) 55% power at 3,660 m (12,008 ft) (45 minutes reserve)
1,260 km (780 mi; 680 nmi) 75% power at 3,660 m (12,008 ft) (no reserve)
1,362 km (846 mi; 735 nmi) 55% power at 3,660 m (12,008 ft) (no reserve)

- Endurance: 75% power at sea level 4 hours 24 minutes

55% power at sea level 5 hours 36 minutes

- Service ceiling: 5,840 m (19,160 ft)
- Absolute ceiling: 6,250 m (20,505 ft)
- g limits: +6 -3
- Rate of climb: 7.75 m/s (1,526 ft/min)
- Time to altitude: 1,830 m (6,004 ft) in 4 minutes 42 seconds

3,050 m (10,007 ft) in 8 minutes 48 seconds

- Wing loading: 97.73 kg/m^{2} (20.02 lb/sq ft)
- Power/mass: 0.167 kW/kg (0.102 hp/lb)
- Take-off run: 287 m (942 ft)
- Take-off distance to 15 m (49 ft): 494 m (1,621 ft)
- Landing run: 238 m (781 ft)
- Landing distance from 15 m (49 ft): 509 m (1,670 ft)

Avionics

- 2x Collins VHF
- CollinsV1R VOR
- Collins ADF-650A
- Collins TOR-950 IFF
- King KTR 908 with 2X King KFS 598A control units
- 2x King KMA 244 audio panels
- 2x King KR 87 ADF
- (Blind-flying instruments with full IFR capability in T-35B)

== See also ==
Related development

- Piper PA-32R

Aircraft of comparable role, configuration, and era

- Beechcraft T-34 Mentor
- Fuji T-3
- Socata TB 30 Epsilon
