= Chilean Air Force =

Air warfare branch of Chile's armed forces

- Fuerza Aérea de Chile
- Coat of arms of the Chilean Air Force
- Founded: 21 March 1930; 96 years ago
- Country: Chile
- Type: Air force
- Role: Aerial warfare
- Part of: Chilean Armed Forces
- Headquarters: Edificio Delphos; Cerrillos, Santiago
- Mottos: Latin: Quam celerrime ad astra "With full speed to the stars"
- Colours: Indigo; White
- March: Alte Kameraden
- Anniversaries: 21 March (Air Force Day)
- Equipment: 193 aircraft
- Engagements: Chilean naval mutiny of 1931; 1973 Chilean coup d'état; Beagle conflict
- Website: www.fach.cl

Commanders
- Commander-in-Chief of the Air Force: General del Aire Hugo Rodríguez González
- Notable commanders: Arturo Merino Benítez; Marmaduke Grove; Gustavo Leigh; Fernando Matthei

Insignia
- Roundel

- Fin flash

- Flag

Aircraft flown
- Electronic warfare: E-3D
- Fighter: F-5, F-16
- Helicopter: Bell 206, Bell 412, S-70, UH-1H, UH-60,
- Reconnaissance: Elbit Hermes 900
- Trainer: A-29, T-35, SR-22, GB1
- Transport: B-737, B-767, C-130, C-212, CJ-1, DHC-6, Gulfstream V, L-35
- Tanker: KC-130, KC-135

The Chilean Air Force (Spanish: Fuerza Aérea de Chile— FACh) is the air force of Chile and a branch of the Chilean Armed Forces.

== History ==
The first step towards the current FACh was taken in 1911, when Captain Manuel Ávalos Prado was sent to France to train as pilot in the flying school of Louis Blériot. Ávalos Prado took command over the Chilean military aviation school, which was officially established in February 1913, and remained in charge until 1915. The Military Aviation School (Escuela de Aviación Militar) was named in honor of him in 1944, and still carries that name today.

In those early years many aviation milestones were achieved; conquering the height of the Andes was one of the main targets as well as long distance flights. Typical aircraft of that era were Avro 504, Bleriot XI, Bristol M.1C, DH.9, and SE5a. In the following decade, the Airmail Line of Chile (Línea Aeropostal de Chile) was created on 5 March 1929 as a branch of the military aviation. This postal airline later developed into the National Airline (Línea Aérea Nacional) that is still the leading airline in Chile today. Shortly afterwards, on 21 March 1930, the existing aviation elements of the army and navy were amalgamated into a dedicated department: the Department of the Air Force (Subsecretaria de Aviación) effectively creating the current independent Air Force. It was initially named National Air Force (Fuerza Aérea Nacional). The international airport of Chile carries the name of Lan's founding father and first commander of the air force, Air Commodore Arturo Merino Benítez. Its baptism of fire was in the 1931 sailors' rebellion in Coquimbo, where Air Force attack aircraft and bombers and 2 transport planes converted into bombers contributed to its failure.

The first outlines of the organization of the current air force were visible in 1945 with the inception of Transport Group 1, later renumbered Group 10, with two C-45s and a single T-6 Texan at Los Cerrillos. Two years later the first FACh flight to Antarctica was performed. The fifties meant entry into the jet age for the FACh, and Grupo 7 was the first unit to receive them in 1954. Chile got its aircraft from both the United States and Europe. The American supply consisted of Lockheed F-80C Shooting Star, Lockheed T-33A T-Bird, Beech T-34 Mentor, Cessna T-37C Tweet, Cessna A-37B Dragonfly and Northrop F-5E/F Tiger II for example, whereas the British supplied DH.100 Vampire FB.5, Hawker Hunter FGA.9 and Canberra PR.9 and the French delivered various helicopters and Mirage 5MA Elkan and Mirage 50CN Panterra aircraft.

During the military coup d'état on September 11, 1973, the Chilean Air Force conducted Operation Silence, Hunters from the 7th Aviation Squadron destroyed several transmission antennas belonging to pro-government radio stations. After accomplishing their mission, the aircraft performed attack runs on the presidential residence at Las Condes and the presidential palace, a pilot mistakenly opened fire on the Air Force Hospital when attacking the residence, no casualties were reported.

The Chilean air force hosted the joint exercise Salitre with other friendly nations in 2014. It also participated in several United Nations peacekeeping missions overseas in 5 occasions.

The Chilean Air Force reported one of its C-130 Hercules transport aircraft carrying 38 people en route to Antarctica missing on December 9, 2019. The aircraft was on its way to Antarctica’s King George Island to provide logistic support to a military base when radio contact was lost. On 11 December 2019, aircraft debris was located 18 miles South of where the plane last made contact and no survivors were found. The cause of the crash is unknown.

== Organization ==
=== Combat Command of the Air Force ===
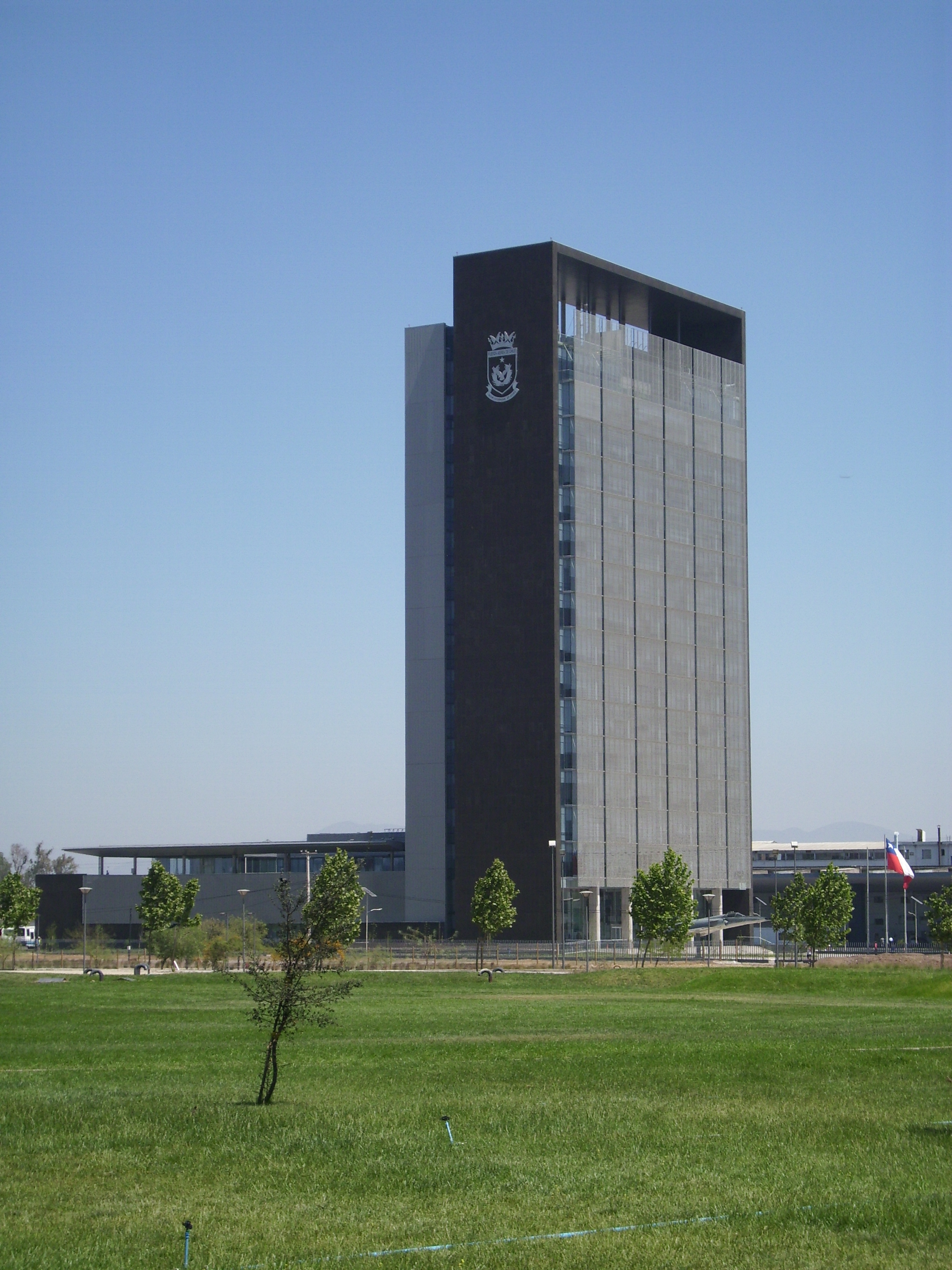
The Delphos building, designed by the Division of Infrastructure of the Logistics Command

First Air Brigade with headquarters in Los Cóndores Air Base (Base Aérea Los Cóndores) in Iquique

- 1st Aviation Squadron
- 2nd Aviation Squadron
- 3rd Aviation Squadron
- 24th Air Defense Squadron
- 34th Telecommunications Squadron
- 44th Aviation Infantry Squadron

Second Air Brigade with headquarters in Pudahuel Air Base (Base Aérea Pudahuel) in Santiago

- 9th Aviation Squadron
- 10th Aviation Squadron
- Air Defence and Special Forces Regiment (Regimiento de Artillería Antiaérea y FF.EE)
- 32nd Telecommunications Squadron

Third Air Brigade with headquarters in El Tepual Air Base (Base Aérea El Tepual) in Puerto Montt

- 5th Aviation Squadron
- 25th Air Defense Squadron
- 35th Telecommunications Squadron

Fourth Air Brigade with headquarters in Chabunco Air Base (Base Aérea Chabunco) in Punta Arenas

- 6th Aviation Squadron

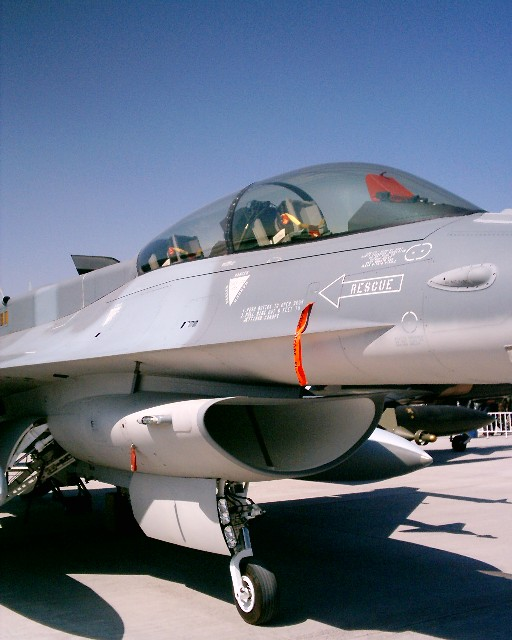
F-16D Block 50M of Chilean Air Force

- 12th Aviation Squadron
- 23rd Air Defense Squadron
- 33rd Telecommunications Squadron
- 19th Antarctic Exploration Squadron

Fifth Air Brigade with headquarters in Cerro Moreno Air Base (Base Aérea Cerro Moreno) in Antofagasta

- 7th Aviation Squadron
- 8th Aviation Squadron
- 21st Air Defense Squadron
- 31st Telecommunications Squadron
- 41st Aviation Infantry Squadron

=== Personnel Command ===
Education Division

- Air Force School "Captain Manuel Ávalos Prado"
- Air Force NCO School "Flight Sergeant Adolfo Menadier Rojas"
- Advanced NCO School
- Air War Academy
- Air Force Polytechnical Academy
- Air Photographic Surveying Service

Health Division
General Hospital of the Air Force

- Clinical Hospital of the Chilean Air Force

Air Force High Command Prefecture

=== Logistics Command ===
Maintenance Division
Administration Division
Infrastructure Division

=== Special Operations ===
The Air Force also maintains the Air Force Special Forces (Comandos de Aviación), comparable to a United States Air Force Combat Control Team. They may be up to 350 strong, and their roles include assault, reconnaissance, Air Traffic Control, Fire Support, and Command, control, and communications.

=== Industry ===
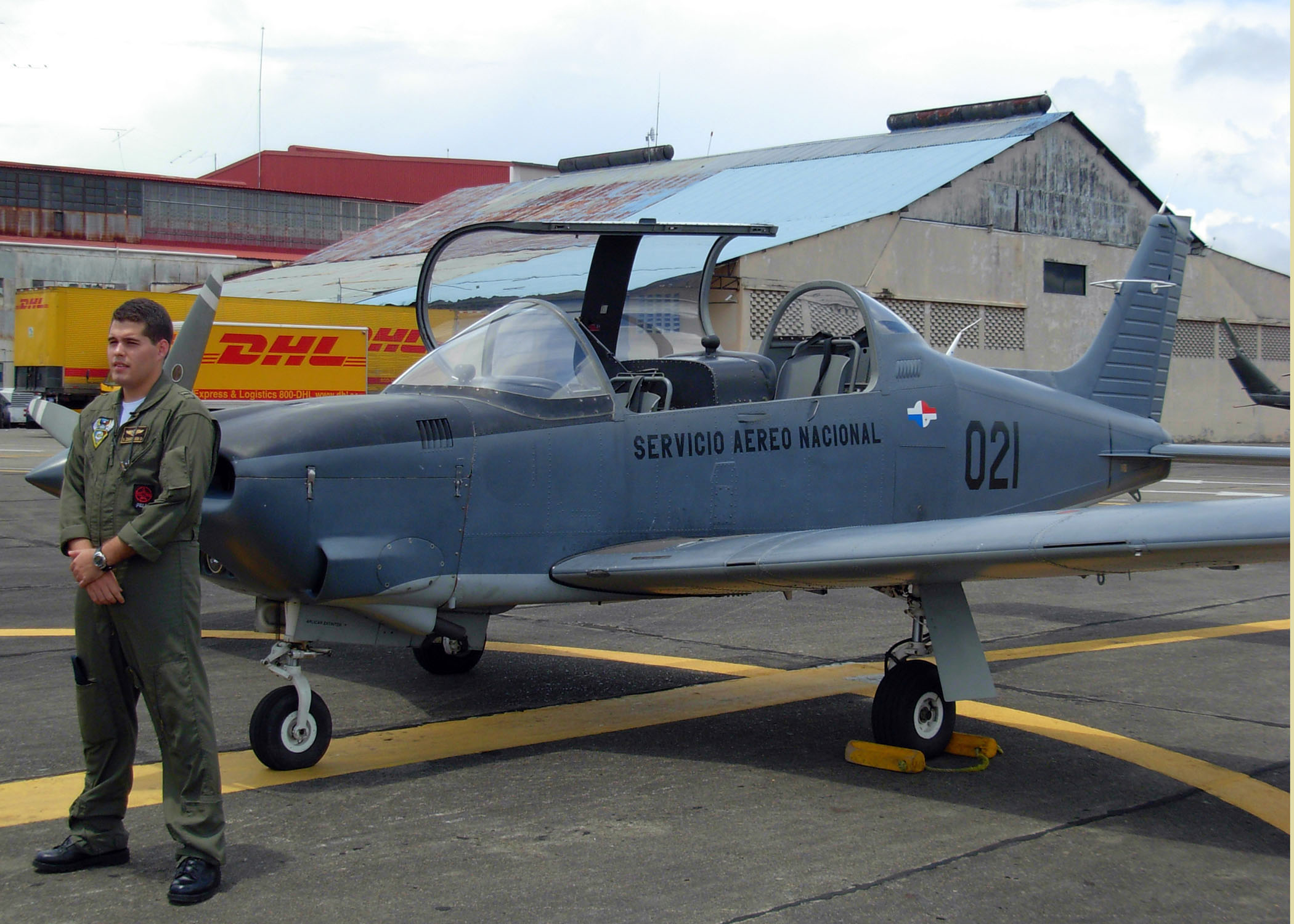
ENAER T-35 Pillán

The Air Force also maintains its own aviation industry, ENAER. The design of the T-35 Pillán trainer, based on the Piper PA-28R Saratoga, is the best known example, seeing some export success as well. Furthermore, the assembly of the A-36/T-36 Halcón (CASA C-101) was achieved as well. Performing maintenance on most types in the current inventory, such as minor modifications on F-5E aircraft for example, the industry is of significant importance to the air force. ENAER is reported to be in talks with Embraer of Brazil to codesign the first indigenous South American military transport plane. Also, under the Pacer Amstel programme, with initial Dutch support, and later locally ENAER upgraded an F-16 combat jet, which for the Chilean Air Force is an advance for their maintenance of the F-16 fleet (becoming the 5th country to modify their jets under authorization).

== Personnel ==
The Chilean Air Force is composed of 10,600 personnel (including 700 conscripts).

=== Ranks ===
Commissioned Officers

Rank group	General / flag officers				Senior officers			Junior officers
Chilean Air Force
Chilean Air Force	General de aire	General de aviación	General de brigada aérea	Comodoro	Coronel de aviación	Comandante de grupo	Comandante de escuadrilla	Capitán de bandada	Teniente	Subteniente	Alférez

Enlisted Ranks

Rank group	Senior NCOs				Junior NCOs			Enlisted
Chilean Air Force								No insignia
Chilean Air Force	Suboficial mayor	Suboficial	Sargento primero	Sargento segundo	Cabo primero	Cabo segundo	Cabo	Soldado de tropa profesional	Alumno

== Aircraft ==
Aircraft	Origin	Role	Variant	In service	Notes
Combat aircraft
Northrop F-5	United States	Light fighter	F-5E F-5F	8 3	Originally, 18 F-5E/F Tiger IIs were acquired in 1975. In the 1990s, they were upgraded to the F-5 Tiger III variant. F-5F used as trainers.
F-16 Fighting Falcon	United States	Multirole	F-16C/D F-16A/B MLU	10 36	10 F-16C/D Block 50 received from the US in 2006 and 36 F-16 AM/BM MLU Block 15/20 from the RNLAF between 2006 and 2011. 11 F-16B/D used as trainers.
AEW&C
E-3 Sentry	United States	AEW&C	E-3D MK1	2	3 units received from the RAF in 2022, one for spare parts.
Reconnaissance
Cessna L-19	United States	Liaison / SAR	L-19A	3	Originally, 6 units were acquired in 1955.
Cessna O-2 Skymaster	United States	Liaison / SAR	O-2A	2	
Tanker
KC-135 Stratotanker	United States	Aerial refueling / transport	KC-135E	3	3 units received from the USAF between 2010 and 2012.
KC-130 Hercules	United States	Transport / aerial refueling	KC-130R	3	Originally, 4 units of this transport variant were received from the USN between 2015 and 2016. They have the capability to refuel the F-5E/F Tiger III in flight.
Transport / Utility
DHC-6 Twin Otter	Canada	Utility / transport	DHC-6-100 DHC-6-300	13	Originally, 20 units were acquired; 8 of the 100 series in 1966, 6 of the 300 series to LAM in 1974 and 6 more of the 300 series in 1978.
C-130 Hercules	United States	Transport	C-130H	4	2 units of this transport variant were received from Lockheed Martin between 1972 and 1973. In 2021, 2 more units were received from the USAF, with a third unit being contemplated.
C-212 Aviocar	Spain	Transport	C-212-200 C-212-300	2 1	Originally 4 units received since March 1995; 2 C-212-200 and 2 C-212-300.
Boeing 737	United States	Transport	330QC 58N	1 1	
Cessna CitationJet	United States	VIP transport / trainer	CJ1	4	4 units received in 2001.
Gulfstream G-IV	United States	VIP transport / utility		4	4 aircraft in total; the first acquired in 2005, the second in 2015, the third in 2020 and the fourth in 2021.
Boeing 767	United States	Transport	300ER	1	1 unit incorporated in 2008.
Helicopters
UH-1 Iroquois	United States	Utility	UH-1H	13	Its replacement is contemplated by 14 units of a helicopter to choose from during the second half of 2023.
Bell 206	United States	Utility	206B Jet Ranger III	5	
UH-60 Black Hawk	United States	Transport / utility	S-70A-39 (UH-60L) S-70i (MH-60M)	1 6	1 unit acquired in 1998. 6 units of PZL Mielec in 2018.
Bell 412	United States	Utility	412SP 412EP	16	
Trainer aircraft
T-35 Pillán	Chile	Trainer	T-35A T-35B T-35BE	30	Various units received from ENAER starting in 1986. They will be replaced from the 2027-2028 period by 33 T-35 Pillán II aircraft.
A-29 Super Tucano	Brazil	Advanced trainer / attack	A-29B	22	22 units in total acquired from Embraer; 12 received since 2009, 6 in 2018 and 4 in 2020.
Cirrus SR22	United States	Trainer	SR-22T	8	8 units in total; 2 received in 2013, 2 in 2015, 2 in 2016 and 2 in 2017.
Aerobatic competition aircraft
GB1 GameBird	United Kingdom	Aerobatics		6	Originally 7 units received from Game Composites in 2019.
UAV
Hermes 900	Israel	Surveillance		3	3 units purchased from Elbit Systems in 2011.
Mantis	Spain	Surveillance		2	UAVs acquired around 2014.

== Bibliography ==
- Hagedorn, Daniel P. (September–October 1996). "Talkback". Air Enthusiast (65): 80. ISSN 0143-5450.
