= François Simon =

François Simon may refer to:

- François Simon (cyclist) (born 1968), former French road bicycle racer
- François Simon (food critic) (born 1953), author and food critic for French daily Le Figaro
- François Simon (actor) (1917–1982), Swiss film actor
- François C. Antoine Simon (1844–1923), president of Haiti, 1908–1911
- François Joseph Simon, better known as Michel Simon (1895–1975), French actor
