= Revue Passager =

Biannual French-English magazine

- Editor: Aude Revier
- Categories: Travel and literary
- Frequency: Biannual
- First issue: 2025
- Company: Éditions du Motif
- Country: France
- Language: French and English
- Website: passager.com
- ISSN: 3076-6915

Revue Passager is a biannual, bilingual French-English language publication from founder Aude Revier. For many years, Revier was editor-in-chief at Air France Magazine, a publication from Éditions Gallimard. The first of three commercially available issues of Revue Passager came out in 2025. The third and latest issue, featuring the writer Siri Hustvedt on the cover, came out in February 2026.

== Category ==
The magazine is difficult to classify, as it is considered atypical. The motto, printed on the cover of each issue in both French and English, is "A magazine of unfolding horizons for those who give themselves time." The Revue is described on the official website as a "magazine like a book and a book like a magazine." The Revue broadly emphasizes traveling as exploration and curiosity. Content includes poetry, essays, interviews and profiles on travel and emerging trends and innovations from unconventional angles.

== Team ==
Besides its long-form articles and interviews, printed on thick white cardstock paper, the Revue Passager emphasizes photography and art. Art direction is overseen by graphic designer Funny Bones.

The translation team includes Alexandra Keens, Alice Marchand, Frédéric Joly, Cécile Chartres, Jessica Volz, and Catherine Ianco.

Editorial content is handled by Fanny LeBorgne and Cécile Chartres.

The magazine features various writers, authors, photographers, illustrators and poets in each issue. These contributors include François Simon, the French journalist Natacha Wolinski, artist Rose Schlossberg (daughter of Caroline Kennedy), Princess Alexandra of Hanover (daughter of Princess Caroline of Monaco), and the photographer Felix Dol Maillot. Schlossberg knew Revier from collaborating previously at Air France magazine.

== Distribution ==
The Revue is distributed as a book (with an ISBN) by Actes Sud. Groupe Flammarion handles the distribution to bookstores and libraries in France. Union Distribution handles distribution in the European Union.

Based in Paris, France, the Revue is distributed throughout France, Belgium, Monaco, Saint Gilles les Bains, French Guiana, Australia, New York City, London, Gstaad, and Venice.

== Issues ==
=== Issue N°0 ===
Numéro Zero (2024) served as a pilot issue.

=== Issue N°1 ===
- Revue Passager N°1 (January 2025) ISBN 978-2-959589-00-3

A primary focal piece in this debut edition is an intimate look into the creative process of French industrial designer Ronan Bouroullec, who influenced the aesthetic tone of the publication.

=== Issue N°2 ===
- Revue Passager N°2 (July 2025) ISBN 978-2-959589-01-0

The issue includes a series of long-form profile pieces curated by French novelist and Prix Fénéon laureate Boris Bergmann.

=== Issue N°3 ===
- Revue Passager N°3 (February 2026) ISBN 978-2-959589-02-7

The cover story is Alexandra Hanover's interview of Siri Hustvedt, titled "Here and There," with photographs from Bettina Pittaluga.

=== Issue N°4 ===
- Revue Passager N°4 (October 2026)

The lead story by anthropologist Raísa França Bastos is about the Cavalhadas de Pirenópolis, Brazil's historical and theatrical eventing festival that has reached its bicentennial as of 2026.

== See also ==
- Actes Sud – The French publishing house that distributes the review.
- Groupe Flammarion - The French publishing house that distributes the publication
- Air France Magazine – The former publication where founder Aude Revier served as editor-in-chief.
- Princess Alexandra of Hanover (born 1999) – a recurring literary contributor.
- Rose Kennedy Schlossberg - one-time contributor to the debut issue
- Siri Hustvedt - Writer and intellectual; the subject of Issue 3's cover story for her latest book, Ghost Stories.
- Mook (publishing) – The specific print format (magazine-book hybrid) that the publication uses.
- Travel literature – The overarching genre of the magazine's content.
