= Edwin Schlossberg =

American designer, artist, and author (born 1945)

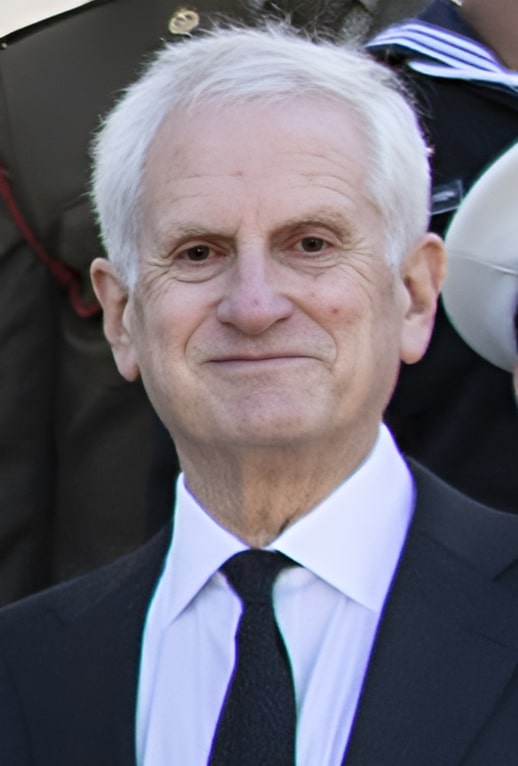
- Schlossberg in 2023
- Born: Edwin Arthur Schlossberg; July 19, 1945 (age 81); New York City, U.S.
- Education: Columbia University (BA, MA, PhD)
- Occupations: Designer; artist; author
- Spouse: Caroline Kennedy (m. 1986)
- Children: Rose; Tatiana; Jack
- Relatives: Kennedy family (by marriage); Bouvier family (by marriage)
- Website: edwinschlossbergart.com

Edwin Arthur Schlossberg (born July 19, 1945) is an American designer, artist, and author. A pioneer and leader of interactive museum installations, he is the founder and principal designer of ESI Design, a multidisciplinary firm specializing in interactive environments for discovery learning and communication. An author of eleven books including Interactive Excellence: Defining and Developing New Standards for the Twenty-first Century, Schlossberg’s artworks have also appeared in solo exhibitions and museum collections in the United States and around the world.

Born and raised in New York City, Schlossberg earned a Ph.D. in Science and Literature from Columbia University and has also lectured at Columbia and the Rhode Island School of Design. Called the "Grandmaster of Interactivity" by the Los Angeles Times, he won the National Arts Club Medal of Honor in 2004, and in 2011, was appointed by 44th U.S. President Barack Obama to the U.S. Commission of Fine Arts, serving until 2013.

== Early life and education ==
Edwin Arthur Schlossberg was born on July 19, 1945, in New York City, to Alfred Irving (1908–1995) and Celia Mae (née Hirsch 1910–2005) Schlossberg. He grew up in an extended Orthodox Jewish family. Four of his great-grandparents were Ellis Island immigrants who were born within 50 miles of one another in the vicinity of Poltava, the Russian Empire. His father was founder and president of a textile-manufacturing company and was also president of the Park East Synagogue in New York's Upper East Side where Schlossberg studied Hebrew and celebrated his Bar Mitzvah. His sister, Maryann Schlossberg Gelula, is an artist.

Schlossberg graduated from Manhattan's Birch Wathen School, then took his undergraduate and post-graduate education at Columbia University, eventually earning a Ph.D. in Science and Literature in 1971. His thesis, which was later published as a book, was an imaginary conversation between Albert Einstein and Samuel Beckett, an idea that Schlossberg conceived while napping at Columbia’s philosophy library. One of his advisors at Columbia was mathematician and philosopher Jacob Bronowski. Schlossberg was also mentored by futurist Buckminster Fuller.

== Career ==
Schlossberg developed as an artist during the 1960s in New York. His style has been described as usage of words and image, through unconventional media, to create visual poetry in his art. He has been singled out as a "leader in interactive design" by Wired magazine, and has also been called a Renaissance man, an intellectual jack-of-all-trades, and the grandmaster of interactivity by several publications.

In an interview with Nature in 2009, Schlossberg stated: "If you put a bucket of water in front of a child—2 years old, 5 years old, even 8 years old—they will play with it forever. They learn a lot because they can craft a range of experiences as they integrate their sensory and physical worlds. I try to design like that”.

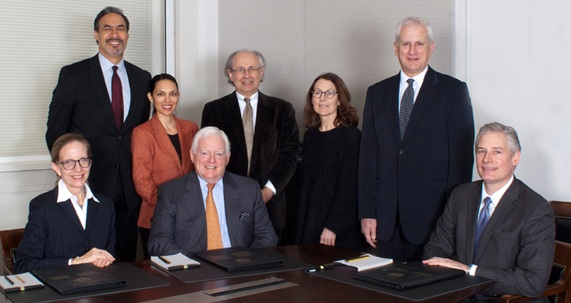
Schlossberg (second from right) with his fellow members in the U.S. Commission of Fine Arts, February 2013

Schlossberg's first foray into interactive design came in 1977, when he was hired to develop exhibits for the Brooklyn Children's Museum. He founded ESI Design that same year. As lead designer of his firm based on Fifth Avenue in New York City, he has created retail and corporate spaces, sales and innovation centers, museums, digital media installations and multi-player game environments for an array of corporations, brands and cultural institutions including: Ellis Island – American Family Immigration History Center, Playa Vista, Pope John Paul II Cultural Center, eBay, PNC Bank, Terrell Place in Washington, D.C., Barclays Center Media Experience in Brooklyn, Best Buy Concept Stores, Edward M. Kennedy Institute for the United States Senate, Reuters Spectacular at 3 Times Square, Sony Plaza and Sony Wonder Technology Lab, Time Warner Home to the Future installation, World Financial Center Breezeway Media Walls, World Trade Center and the World Financial Center Informational Kiosks.

Schlossberg has authored eleven books and has also lectured at Columbia, the School of the Visual Arts, and the Rhode Island School of Design. His artworks have also appeared in solo exhibitions and museum collections in the United States and around the world.

In 2004, he won the National Arts Club Medal of Honor, and in 2011, was appointed by 44th U.S. President Barack Obama to the U.S. Commission of Fine Arts, serving until 2013. He was named fellow by the Society for Experiential Graphic Design in 2020.

== Personal life ==
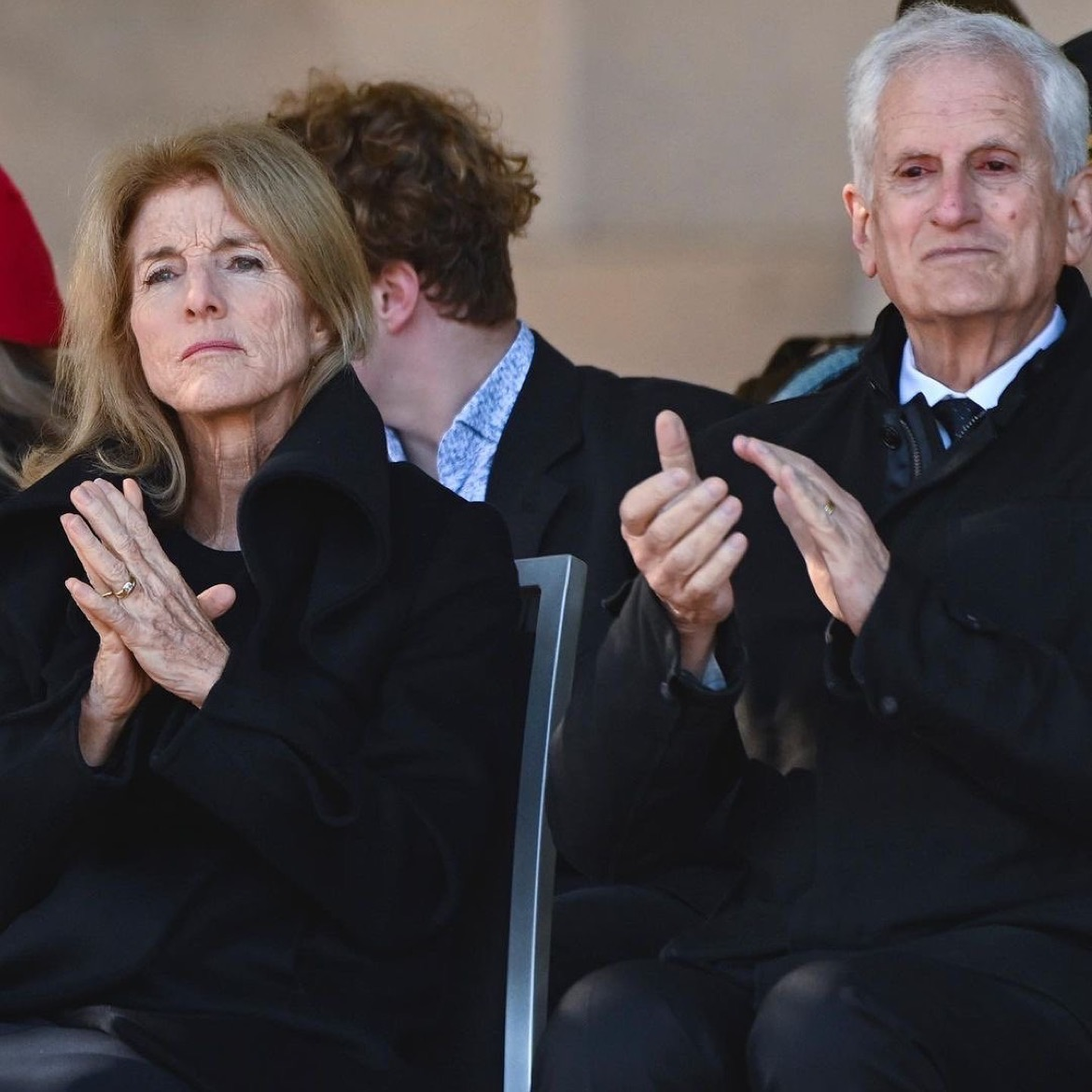
Schlossberg with wife Caroline Kennedy in Canberra in April 2023

Schlossberg married Caroline Kennedy, daughter of John F. Kennedy and Jacqueline Kennedy Onassis, in a Catholic ceremony at Our Lady of Victory Church in Centerville, Massachusetts, on July 19, 1986, his 41st birthday. They met while both were working at the Metropolitan Museum of Art. They have three children, all born in New York: Rose (b. 1988), Tatiana Celia (1990–2025), and John Bouvier "Jack" (b. 1993).

Schlossberg's daughter Tatiana died at the age of 35 from acute myeloid leukemia.

== In popular culture ==
Schlossberg is portrayed by Ben Shenkman in the 2026 television mini-series Love Story.

== Selected bibliography ==
- Schlossberg, Edwin (1973). Einstein and Beckett; a record of an imaginary discussion with Albert Einstein and Samuel Beckett. New York: Links. ISBN 0825630118.
- Schlossberg, Edwin (1977). The philosopher's game: match your wits against the 100 greatest thinkers of all time. New York: St. Martin's Press. ISBN 0312604629.
- Fuller, R.B.; Schlossberg, E. (1977). Tetrascroll. Universal Limited Art Editions.
- Schlossberg, Edwin (1985). The pirated edition of Stevens and Bohr: a record of correspondence between Wallace Stevens and Niels Bohr and journals written during that correspendence. London; Zurich: Princelet Editions. ISBN 0862980143.
- Schlossberg, Edwin (1998). Interactive excellence: defining and developing new standards for the twenty-first century. Library of contemporary thought. New York: Ballantine. ISBN 0345423712.
