= Air France Magazine =

Bilingual French-English inflight magazine

EnVois Air France
- Editor: Florence Willaert, Ludivine Le Goff, Camille Bouvet
- Categories: Inflight
- Frequency: Bimonthly
- Publisher: Éditions Gallimard, Air France (1997-2021), Michelin Guide (EnVois, 2022-present)
- First issue: 1934, 1935, 1997, 2022
- Final issue: 2021 (before rebrand as EnVois)
- Company: Air France
- Country: France
- Language: French and English
- Website: https://www.en-vols.com/en/the-magazine/
- ISSN: 1290-1563
- OCLC: 473523624

Air France Magazine is a French-English bilingual, inflight magazine published by the French airline Air France to be distributed free of charge on board Air France aircraft to passengers during its flights. The magazine has changed its name three times since its original founding in the 1930s. The current name, since 2022, is EnVois Air France.

== Original magazine ==
Air France launched its first monthly magazine, titled "Air France revue" (Note: This first issue included layout designed by graphic designer Alexandre Chem.) in 1934, then, under the same name, a quarterly version from January 1935 which continued until the early 1970s.

== The magazine after 1997 ==
It later became the monthly magazine "Air France Atlas". In spring 1997, the monthly format changed to "Air France Magazine". Written in French and English, this monthly publication has over one million readers. The covers were notably illustrated by graphic designer Vanessa Vérillon. The magazine at that time was published by Éditions Gallimard.

The last editor-in-chief for Air France magazine as it ceased to be in 2021 was Aude Revier, currently the founding director at Revue Passager.

== EnVois ==
After 2021, Air France magazine rebranded under the title EnVois. Florence Willaert oversees editorial management overall. Ludivine Le Goff oversees editorial management for the digital platform. Camille Bouvet is Travel Content Editor. The current magazine is published by Michelin Guide. ReWorld Media handles the magazine's digital space.

The first issue of EnVois was launched on 28 February 2022. The magazine is available both in print and digitally.

== See also ==
- Inflight magazine
- Air France

== External links / further reading ==
- EnVois - the new Air France magazine after 2021
- Sauver Air France by Pascal Perri (Éditions L'Harmattan, 1994)
- Fabienne Autier & Gregory Corcos & Georges Trépo, April 2001, Air France : des années héroïques à la refondation. No. hal-02298016. 2001.
- Thérenty, Marie-Ève. "Les heures d’or de l’aviation française. Nungesser et Coli ont réussi."
- Siddiqi, Asif. "The Beginnings of French Commercial Aviation."
- Turgan, Louis. Histoire de l'aviation: avions et aviateurs, d'hier, d'aujourd'hui, de demain (Étude documentaire). L. Geisler, 1909.
