= Jack Schlossberg =

American writer and political commentator (born 1993)

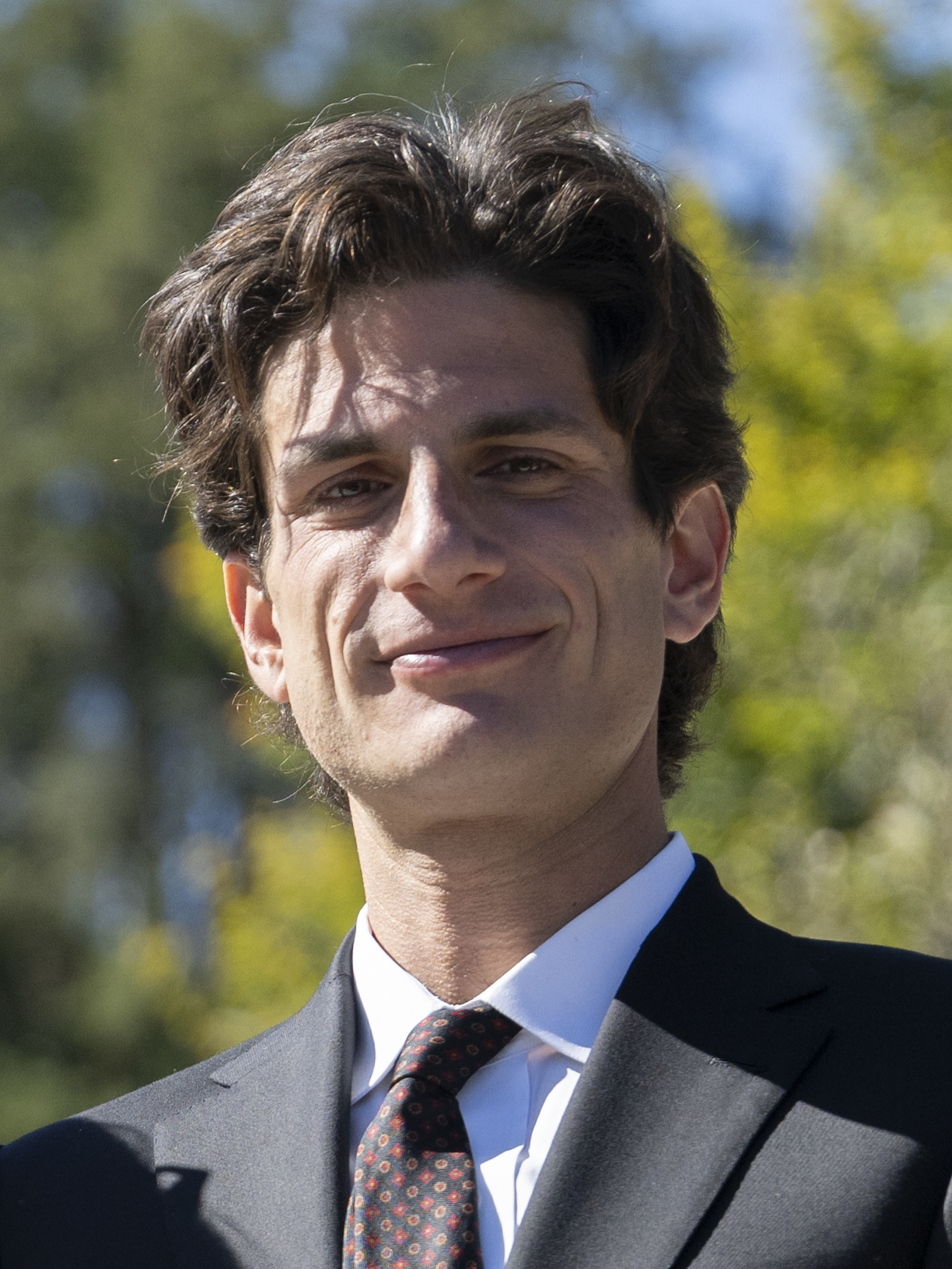
- Schlossberg in 2024
- Born: John Bouvier Kennedy Schlossberg; January 19, 1993 (age 33); New York City, U.S.
- Education: Yale University (BA); Harvard University (JD, MBA)
- Political party: Democratic
- Parents: Edwin Schlossberg (father); Caroline Kennedy (mother)
- Family: Kennedy family; Bouvier family
- Website: Campaign website

John Bouvier Kennedy Schlossberg (born January 19, 1993) is an American social media personality, political commentator and writer. He is a member of the Kennedy family and the Bouvier family.

Schlossberg ran for the seat being vacated by retiring incumbent Jerry Nadler in the 2026 U.S. House of Representatives elections. He finished third in the Democratic primary.

== Early life and education ==
John Bouvier Kennedy Schlossberg was born on January 19, 1993, in New York City, to designer Edwin Schlossberg and diplomat Caroline Kennedy. Schlossberg is named after his maternal grandfather, John F. Kennedy of the Kennedy family, who served as U.S. president (1961–1963) and as U.S. senator from Massachusetts (1953–1960), and after a matrilineal great-grandfather, John Vernou Bouvier III, who was a Wall Street stockbroker from the Bouvier family. Senator Ted Kennedy of Massachusetts was his grand-uncle as well as godfather.

His father comes from an Orthodox Jewish family of Ashkenazi Jewish descent from Ukraine, and his mother is a Catholic of Irish, French, Scottish, and English descent. He was raised Catholic, but his mother said that the family would also incorporate Hanukkah in their holiday celebrations. Schlossberg and his two older sisters, Rose and Tatiana (1990–2025), were primarily raised on Manhattan's Upper East Side, but also spent significant time at Red Gate Farm, the Aquinnah, Massachusetts estate of their maternal grandmother, the First Lady Jacqueline Bouvier Kennedy Onassis, while growing up.

Schlossberg attended Collegiate School. In eighth grade, he co-founded ReLight New York, a nonprofit organization that installed energy-efficient compact fluorescent lights in low-income housing developments. In 2010, Schlossberg worked in Washington, D.C., as a Senate page for then-Senator John Kerry of Massachusetts, and the following year, as a Senate intern. He then attended Yale University, graduating in 2015 with a degree in history, with a focus on Japanese history. While at Yale, Schlossberg was known to perform stand-up comedy, was a member of the Sigma Phi Epsilon fraternity, and wrote for the Yale Daily News and The Yale Herald.

Schlossberg lived and worked in Japan where his mother was the U.S. Ambassador, before enrolling at Harvard University where he graduated from the joint Juris Doctor – Master of Business Administration program at Harvard Law School and Harvard Business School in 2022. In February 2023, he passed the New York bar exam.

Schlossberg has been a resident of the Chelsea neighborhood of Manhattan.

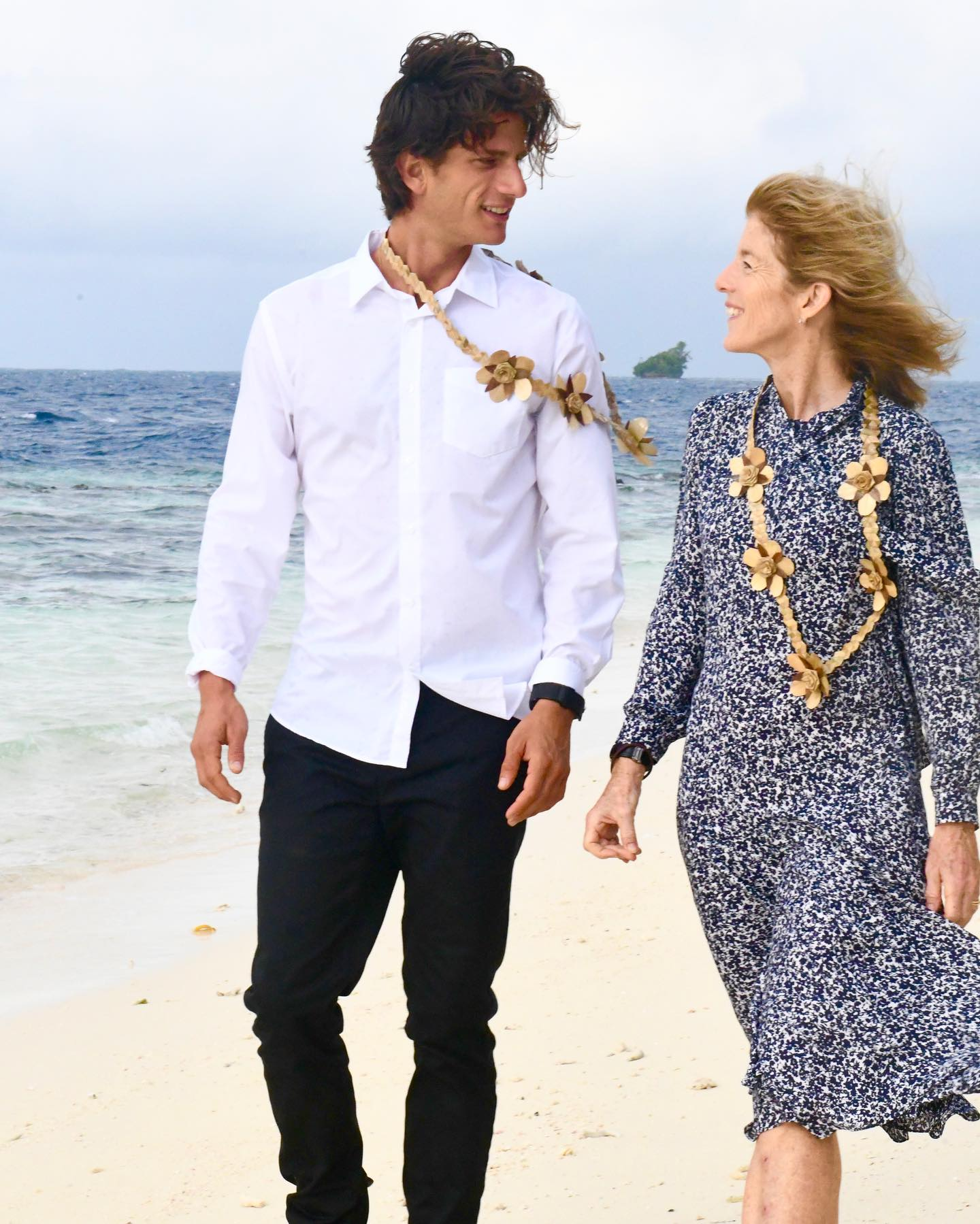
Schlossberg with his mother Caroline at Kennedy Island in 2023

== Career ==
Since 2011, Schlossberg has contributed articles and op-eds to various publications, including Time, The Washington Post, and Vogue. In 2015, Schlossberg started working at Rakuten, a Japanese internet and e-commerce company, in Tokyo. He also worked at the Japanese distillery Suntory. He met Hiroshi Mikitani, the CEO of Rakuten, while visiting Sendai accompanying his mother on her duties as U.S. ambassador to Japan. Schlossberg returned to the United States in 2016 to work as a staff assistant in the State Department's Bureau of Oceans and International Environmental and Scientific Affairs; The New York Times reported that he held the role for "less than four months". He had a cameo role in the eighth-season finale of the television show Blue Bloods in 2018.

=== Social media presence ===
Schlossberg maintains active and public profiles across several social media platforms, including Instagram, TikTok, and X (Twitter), having nearly 2 million followers. Columnist Maureen Dowd described his social media personality as "charismatic — and sometimes pugnacious, crude and off-the-wall". Dowd says he "feigns being crazy", and "spars and trolls" and "engages in high jinks". Schlossberg has been criticized by some due to his social media posts, including one comparing the "hotness" of Usha Vance to his grandmother Jackie Kennedy Onassis, which "drew immediate backlash", and where he later explained was intended to provoke discussion and test the limits of online discourse.

In February 2025, attorney Alan Dershowitz announced his intention to sue Schlossberg for defamation following an Instagram video in which Schlossberg claimed Dershowitz had killed his first wife. Schlossberg initially deactivated his account, stating, "I'm sorry to everyone. I was wrong. I'm deleting all my social media. Forever." He later returned, said he had just been "faking [his] own social media death," and mocked the legal threat from Dershowitz.

== Political aspirations ==
Schlossberg first became interested in politics in 2007, when then-Illinois US Senator Barack Obama began his presidential primary campaign. He said Obama's campaign inspired him to learn about politics and to study the legacy of his grandfather, John F. Kennedy. In 2012, when asked about his interest in entering politics, Schlossberg stated: "Politics definitely interests me. I'm most interested in public service. I think that's something that I got from being part of my family, which is such an honor."

=== Democratic National Committee ===
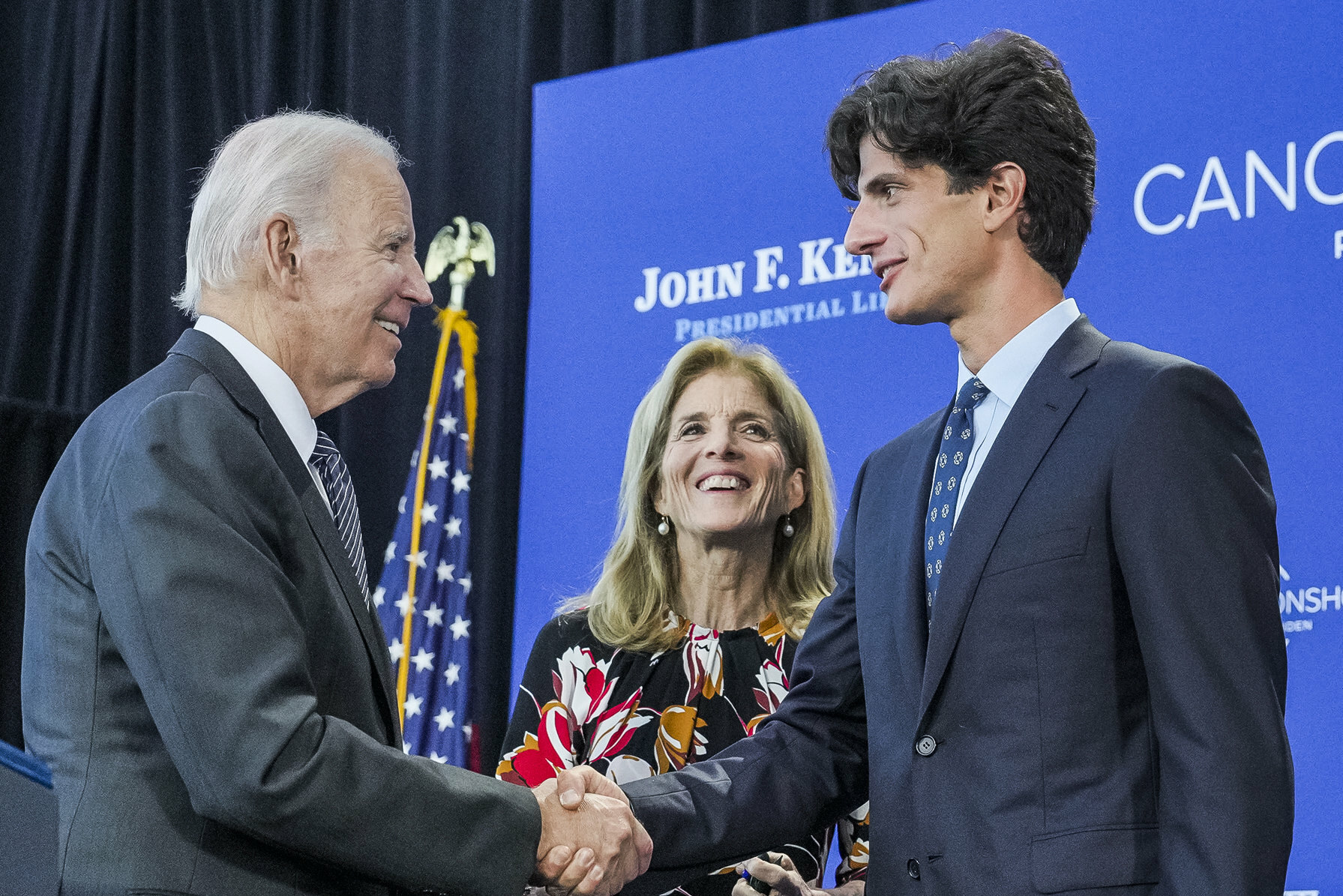
Schlossberg with President Joe Biden and mother Caroline in Boston, Massachusetts, 2022

In August 2020, Schlossberg gave a virtual address on the second night of the 2020 Democratic National Convention with his mother, Caroline, and endorsed Joe Biden's run for the presidency. In 2023, Schlossberg publicly criticized the presidential campaign of his first cousin once removed, Robert F. Kennedy Jr., and supported Biden's re-election.

Schlossberg gave his first in-person speech on the second night of the 2024 Democratic National Convention in Chicago, where he endorsed Kamala Harris. In September 2024, Schlossberg became co-chair of the environmental organization Climate Power's campaign "Too Hot Not to Vote", an initiative designed to "engage, educate and motivate people to vote for climate and clean energy champions” in the 2024 presidential election. Media outlets have portrayed Schlossberg as a "new face" of the Kennedy family, and a "new hope" of the Democratic Party.

=== U.S. House of Representatives race ===
Following Congressman Jerry Nadler's September 2025 announcement that he would not seek re-election in 2026, Schlossberg expressed interest in mounting a campaign for Nadler's seat, representing New York's 12th congressional district. On November 11, 2025, he announced his candidacy. Schlossberg's candidacy has been criticized by primary opponents and political analysts for a lack of professional experience and local civic engagement.

In May 2026, The New York Times published an investigative report characterizing Schlossberg's campaign operation as "erratic and plagued by turnover". Former staffers alleged that Schlossberg frequently missed weekly strategy meetings, abruptly terminated personnel, or neglected to formally notify employees of their dismissal.

While early polling showed a competitive race, Schlossberg was defeated in the Democratic primary on June 23, 2026, finishing a distant third behind Micah Lasher and Alex Bores.
