= Tatiana Schlossberg =

American journalist and author (1990–2025)

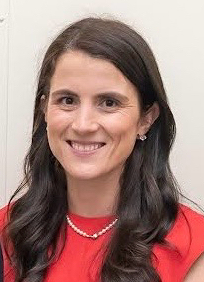
- Schlossberg in 2024
- Born: Tatiana Celia Kennedy Schlossberg; May 5, 1990; New York City, U.S.
- Died: December 30, 2025 (aged 35); New York City, U.S.
- Education: Yale University (BA); University of Oxford (MSt)
- Occupations: Environmental journalist; author
- Years active: 2014–2025
- Spouse: George Moran (m. 2017)
- Children: 2
- Parents: Edwin Schlossberg; Caroline Kennedy
- Family: Kennedy family; Bouvier family
- Website: tatianaschlossberg.com

Tatiana Celia Kennedy Schlossberg (May 5, 1990 – December 30, 2025) was an American environmental journalist and author. She worked as a science and climate reporter for The New York Times and wrote for several other publications, including The Atlantic, The Washington Post, Vanity Fair, and Bloomberg News. Her book Inconspicuous Consumption: The Environmental Impact You Don't Know You Have was published by Grand Central Publishing in 2019.

Schlossberg was a member of the Kennedy family and Bouvier family. She graduated from Yale University and later earned a Master of Studies degree in American history from the University of Oxford. She died in 2025 at the age of 35 from acute myeloid leukemia.

== Early life and education ==
Tatiana Celia Kennedy Schlossberg was born on May 5, 1990, in Lenox Hill, Manhattan in New York City at Weill Cornell Medical Center to Edwin Schlossberg and Caroline Kennedy. Her first two names were named after Tatyana Grosman, founder of Universal Limited Art Editions, Edwin Schlossberg's employer and Edwin Schlossberg's mother Celia Mae Schlossberg. She was a granddaughter of 35th U.S. president John F. Kennedy and First Lady Jacqueline Bouvier Kennedy Onassis.

She and her siblings, Rose and Jack, were primarily raised on Manhattan's Upper East Side, and also spent significant time on Martha's Vineyard. Schlossberg's father came from an Orthodox Jewish family of Ashkenazi descent from Ukraine, and her mother is a Catholic of Irish, French, Scottish, and English descent. She was raised Catholic, though her mother would also "incorporate Hanukkah" in the family's holiday celebrations.

Schlossberg attended the all-girls Brearley School with her sister Rose, and later the Trinity School, from which she graduated in 2008. She graduated from Yale College in 2012 with a BA degree in History. While at Yale, Schlossberg wrote for The Yale Herald and eventually became the paper's editor-in-chief. She received the Charles A. Ryskamp Travel Grant for a research project that "explored the communities that grew out of the relationship between runaway slaves and coastal New England Native American tribes, particularly on Martha's Vineyard in the nineteenth century". She was also a member of the senior society Mace and Chain. Schlossberg earned a Master of Studies degree in American history from Jesus College, Oxford in 2014.

== Career ==
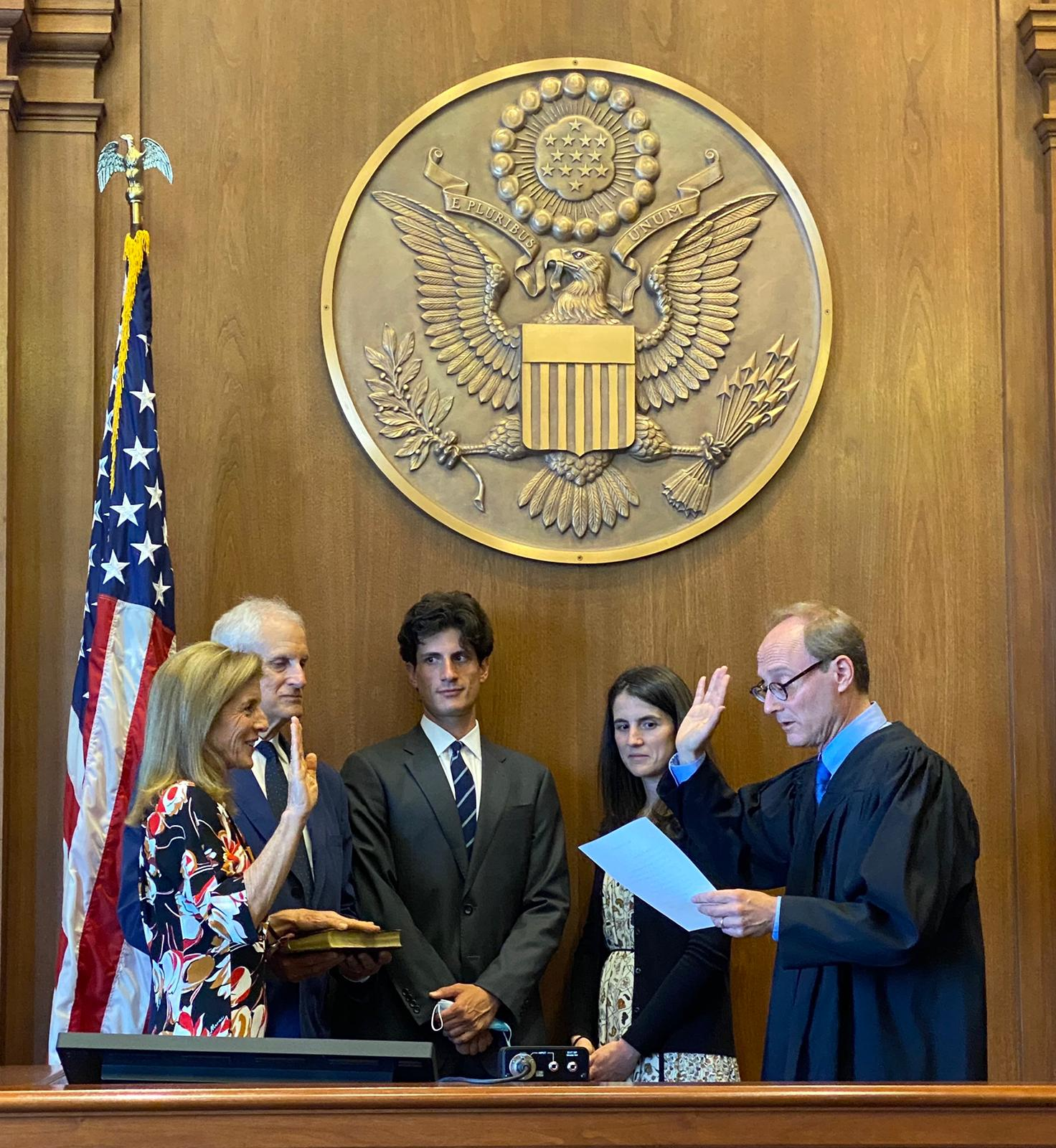
Schlossberg watching her mother being sworn in as U.S. Ambassador to Australia, right of her brother, Jack

After her studies, Schlossberg interned at the Vineyard Gazette in Edgartown, Massachusetts, and later became a municipal reporter at The Record in Bergen County, New Jersey.

In 2014, she became a summer intern at The New York Times, a 10-week program usually given to recent college graduates and a few undergrads. She was eventually hired as a reporter covering the Metro section. That same year, she wrote a story about a dead bear cub found in Central Park. In 2024, it was revealed that the cub had been placed there by her relative Robert F. Kennedy Jr. Responding to the disclosure, Schlossberg said, "Like law enforcement, I had no idea who was responsible for this when I wrote the story."

Schlossberg worked as a science and climate reporter for the Times until she left the paper in 2017. In 2019, she published her debut book, Inconspicuous Consumption: The Environmental Impact You Don't Know You Have, released in August 2019 by Grand Central Publishing. In 2020, the book won first place in the Society of Environmental Journalists' Rachel Carson Environment Book Award.

Schlossberg took part in presenting the annual Profile in Courage Award at the John F. Kennedy Presidential Library and Museum in Boston, and accompanied her mother, Caroline Kennedy, during the latter's engagements as ambassador in Japan and Australia.

== Personal life and death ==
"I have added a new tragedy to [my mother's] life, to our family's life, and there's nothing I can do to stop it."

— Tatiana Schlossberg talking about her diagnosis of acute myeloid leukemia in a November 2025 article with The New Yorker.

On the 50th anniversary of the assassination of her grandfather John F. Kennedy in 2013, Schlossberg delivered remarks and participated in a wreath-laying ceremony at his memorial at Runnymede in Surrey, which had been unveiled in 1965 by Queen Elizabeth II and Schlossberg's grandmother Jacqueline.

On September 9, 2017, Schlossberg married physician George Moran at her family's estate on Martha's Vineyard. The two met as undergraduates at Yale. The couple had a son in 2022 and a daughter in 2024.

Immediately after the birth of her daughter, Schlossberg was diagnosed with acute myeloid leukemia. On November 22, 2025, Schlossberg revealed in an essay in The New Yorker that her leukemia had developed "a rare mutation called Inversion 3", which made it a terminal form of the disease. A bone marrow transplant, chemotherapy, and a clinical trial of CAR-T cell therapy were unable to slow the progression of the leukemia, and her doctors informed her that she had one year to live. Schlossberg died on December 30, 2025, at the age of 35. Her funeral was held on January 5, 2026, at the Church of St. Ignatius Loyola in Manhattan, the same church where the funeral of her maternal grandmother, Jacqueline, had been held in 1994.
