= Rose Schlossberg =

American artist and filmmaker (born 1988)

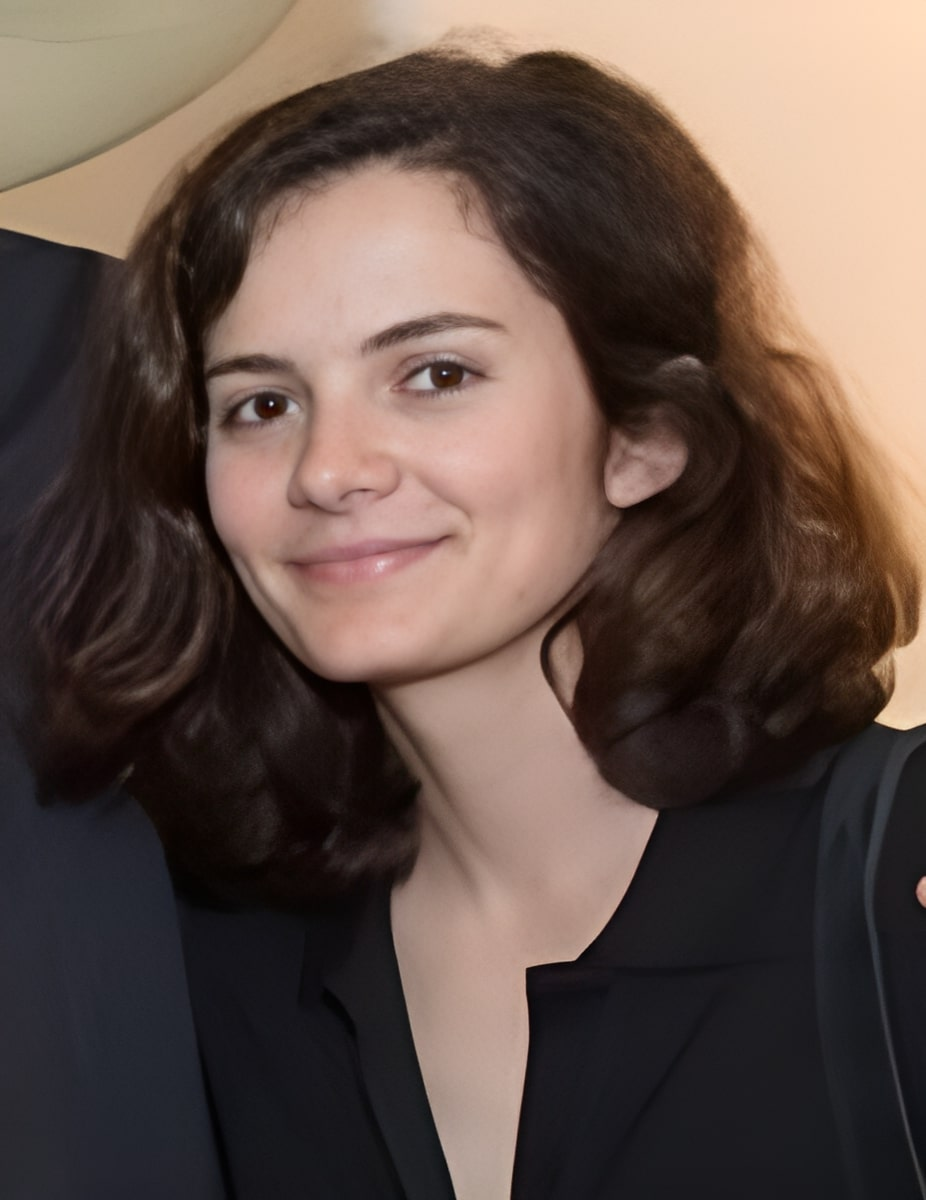
- Schlossberg in 2015
- Born: Rose Kennedy Schlossberg; June 25, 1988 (age 38); New York City, U.S.
- Education: Harvard University (BA); New York University (MPS)
- Occupations: Artist, filmmaker
- Spouse: Rory McAuliffe (m. 2022)
- Parents: Edwin Schlossberg; Caroline Kennedy
- Family: Kennedy family Bouvier family
- Website: roseschlossberg.com

Rose Kennedy Schlossberg (born June 25, 1988) is an American artist and filmmaker specializing in video installations. She created the apocalyptic installation art and web series End Times Girls Club, co-produced and co-wrote the Peabody Award-winning documentary series Time: The Kalief Browder Story (2017), and has also directed music videos and short films.

Born and raised in New York City, Schlossberg graduated from Harvard University and New York University where she earned her Master of Professional Studies degree. She is the elder daughter of designer Edwin Schlossberg and diplomat Caroline Kennedy, and first-born grandchild of John F. Kennedy, the 35th president of the United States, and First Lady Jacqueline Kennedy Onassis.

== Early life and education ==
Schlossberg was born on June 25, 1988, at Weill Cornell Medical Center in Lenox Hill, Manhattan, New York City, to designer and artist Edwin Schlossberg and attorney Caroline Kennedy. Her maternal grandparents were U.S. President John F. Kennedy and First Lady Jacqueline Bouvier Kennedy Onassis. She is named after her maternal great-grandmother, the philanthropist Rose Kennedy. She and her younger siblings, Tatiana (1990-2025) and Jack, were primarily raised on Manhattan's Upper East Side, and also spent significant time at their maternal grandmother Jacqueline's estate on Martha's Vineyard growing up. Schlossberg's father comes from an Orthodox Jewish family of Ashkenazi Jewish descent from Ukraine, and her mother is a Catholic of Irish, French, Scottish, and English descent. She was raised Catholic, but her mother would also "incorporate Hanukkah" in the family's holiday party. In 1996, she served as a flower girl to her uncle John F. Kennedy Jr.'s wedding.

Schlossberg attended Brearley School, a private school for girls in Manhattan. In 2006, she enrolled at Harvard University where she studied English literature and documentary filmmaking. While at Harvard, Schlossberg was a research assistant at the Radcliffe Institute. In 2013, she graduated from New York University's Tisch School of the Arts with a Master of Professional Studies degree focusing on video installation.

== Career ==
Schlossberg held various positions with Blowback Productions from 2010 to 2012, including associate editor, associate producer, and production associate. She was also a writer and researcher at Red Board Productions, and also worked for television writer and producer David Milch. She has since developed TV projects with Broadway Video, TruTV and Warner Bros. Television.

In 2016, Schlossberg launched a comedy end time-apocalyptic web series titled End Times Girls Club, produced by Above Average Productions. The series follows Schlossberg as she gives women comic tips to surviving the apocalypse. It was originally conceived from her master’s thesis installation at NYU. Since then, it has evolved into several forms – as a TV pilot produced by Saturday Night Live producer Lorne Michaels in 2017, a Slumber Party Bunker installation in Paris in 2023, and a TikTok channel.

In 2017, she co-produced and co-wrote the Peabody Award-winning documentary series Time: The Kalief Browder Story. In 2018, she was commissioned by Dover Street Market president Adrian Joffe to produce a series of promotional videos for the retailer’s Los Angeles location. In 2020, she once again collaborated with the retailer, as well as the non-profit When We All Vote, for a video series campaigning for increased voter turnout for the 2020 United States presidential election. Schlossberg has also directed music videos for Hyd, Dougie Poole, Swaai Boys, and Ducktails.

She directed, wrote, and starred in the short film Short Gay Tragedy #1 which debuted at the 45th Mill Valley Film Festival in 2022. The same year, she helped open the permanent exhibit honoring John F. Kennedy at the Kennedy Center together with cellist Yo-Yo Ma and second gentleman Doug Emhoff.

In 2025, she wrote a piece about the Channel Islands archipelago off the coast of California for the debut issue of Revue Passager, a biannual, bilingual magazine based in Paris. She had previously done work for the magazine's founder, Aude Revier, when Revier was editor-in-chief at Air France magazine.

== Personal life ==
Schlossberg has been the subject of media coverage throughout her life but largely kept herself out of the public eye. She resides in Ojai, California, with her wife, restaurateur Rory McAuliffe, whom she married in 2022.
