= François Simon (food critic) =

French food critic

François Simon (French pronunciation: [fʁɑ̃swa simɔ̃]; born 1953) is a French author and a food critic, rumored in French press to have been the model for Anton Ego, the food critic in the 2007 animated film Ratatouille (though denied by the film's director, Brad Bird). He spent most of his career writing for French daily Le Figaro, which he left at the beginning of 2014.

He appears in a 2016 episode of the Netflix documentary series Chef's Table, discussing the cuisine of Adeline Grattard, chef at the restaurant Yam'Tcha in Paris. He is a regular contributor as a food critic to the biannual, bilingual publication Revue Passager.
