= Caroline Kennedy =

American author and diplomat (born 1957)

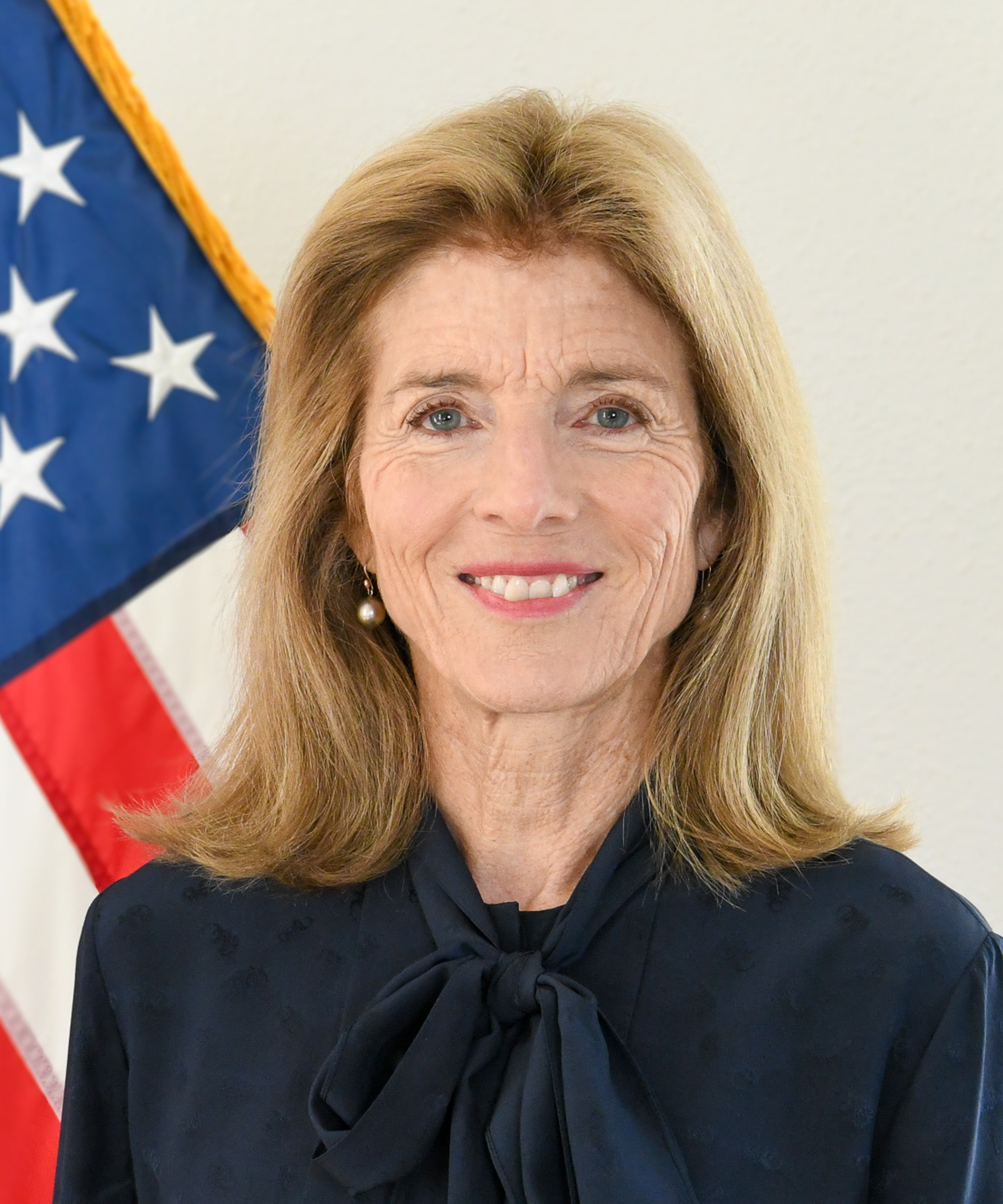
- Official portrait, 2022

United States Ambassador to Australia
- In office July 25, 2022 – November 28, 2024
- President: Joe Biden
- Preceded by: Arthur B. Culvahouse Jr.
- Succeeded by: Dave Brat

United States Ambassador to Japan
- In office November 19, 2013 – January 18, 2017
- President: Barack Obama
- Preceded by: John Roos
- Succeeded by: Bill Hagerty

Personal details
- Born: Caroline Bouvier Kennedy; November 27, 1957 (age 68) New York City, U.S.
- Party: Democratic
- Spouse: Edwin Schlossberg (m. 1986)
- Children: Rose; Tatiana; Jack
- Parents: John F. Kennedy; Jacqueline Kennedy Onassis
- Relatives: Kennedy family Bouvier family
- Education: Radcliffe College (AB); Columbia University (JD)
- Awards: Grand Cordon of the Order of the Rising Sun (2021)
- Kennedy's voice Kennedy's opening statement at her confirmation hearing for U.S. ambassador to Australia; Recorded April 7, 2022

Caroline Bouvier Kennedy (born November 27, 1957) is an American author, diplomat, and attorney. She served as the United States ambassador to Japan from 2013 to 2017 and ambassador to Australia from 2022 to 2024. Most of Kennedy's professional life has been in literature, law, politics, education reform, and charity. She is a member of the Kennedy family and the only surviving child of President John F. Kennedy and First Lady Jacqueline Kennedy Onassis.

Born in New York City, Kennedy was two years old when her father won the 1960 presidential election and spent her early childhood years in the White House during his presidency. She was only five days shy of her sixth birthday when he was assassinated on November 22, 1963. The following year, Kennedy moved with her younger brother, John F. Kennedy Jr., and their mother Jacqueline to the Upper East Side of Manhattan, and continued her education there. She graduated from Radcliffe College and later attended Columbia Law School, earning a Juris Doctor degree in 1988. Kennedy passed the New York State bar exam the following year. She worked at Manhattan's Metropolitan Museum of Art, where she met her future husband, designer Edwin Schlossberg. They married in 1986, and had three children: Rose, Tatiana, and Jack.

Early in the primary race for the 2008 presidential election, Kennedy and her uncle, Ted Kennedy, endorsed Democratic candidate Barack Obama. She later stumped for him in Florida, Indiana, and Ohio, served as co-chair of his Vice Presidential Search Committee, and addressed the 2008 Democratic National Convention in Denver. After Obama selected United States senator Hillary Clinton to serve as secretary of state, Kennedy expressed interest in being appointed to Clinton's vacant Senate seat from New York, but later withdrew for personal reasons. In 2013, Obama appointed Kennedy as the United States ambassador to Japan, making her the first woman to hold the position. Eight years later, Joe Biden appointed Kennedy as ambassador to Australia and she took office following her confirmation on June 10, 2022.

== Early life ==
Caroline Bouvier Kennedy was born on November 27, 1957, at New York Hospital in Lenox Hill, Manhattan to Jacqueline Bouvier Kennedy and John F. Kennedy, then a U.S. senator from Massachusetts. She is named after her maternal aunt, Lee Radziwill, and maternal great-great-grandmother, Caroline Ewing Bouvier. A year before Kennedy's birth, her parents had a stillborn daughter, Arabella. Kennedy had a younger brother, John Jr., who was born two days before her third birthday in 1960. Another brother, Patrick, died two days after his premature birth in 1963. Kennedy lived with her parents in Georgetown, Washington, D.C. during the first three years of her life.

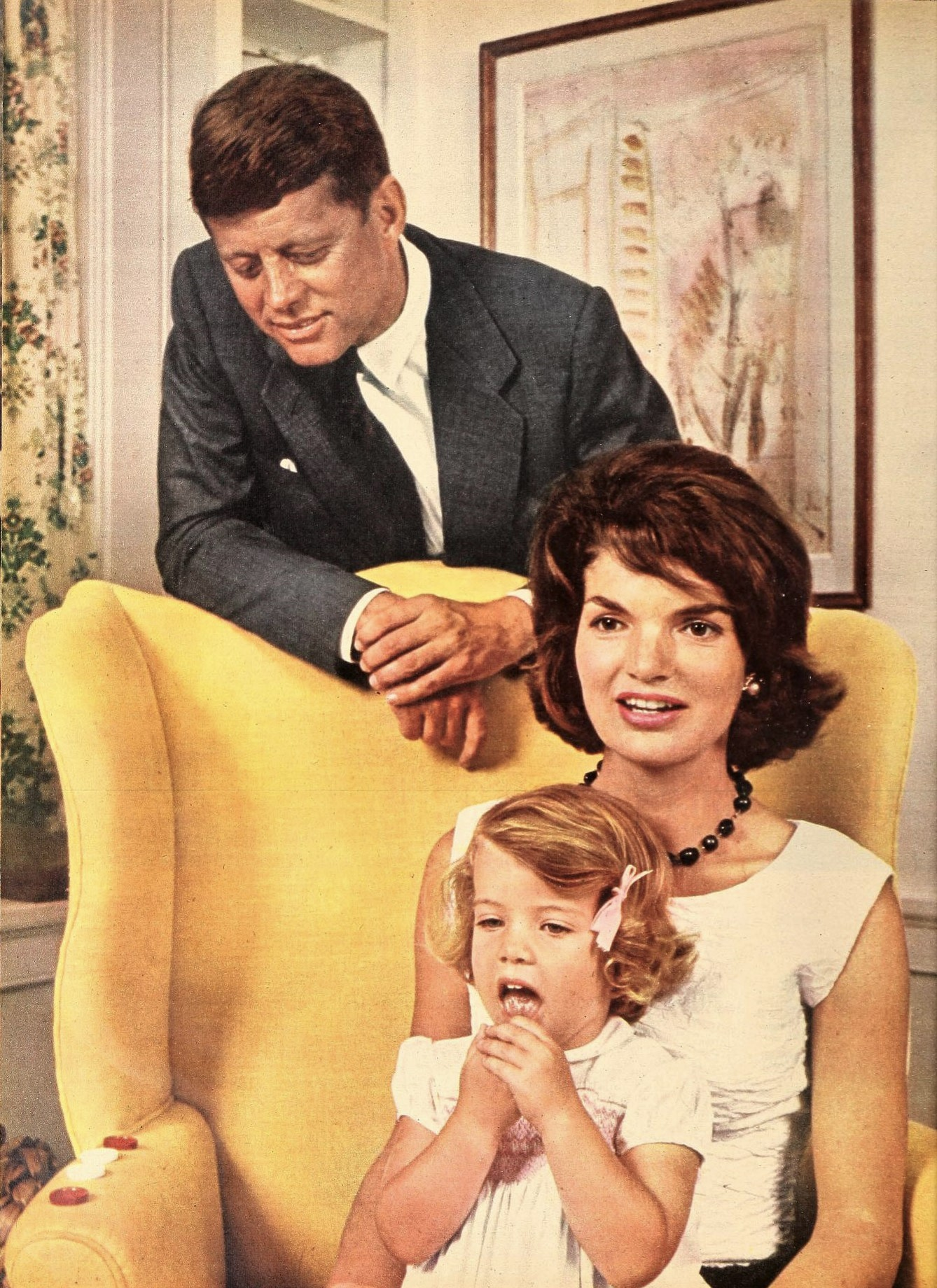
Kennedy with her parents, John and Jacqueline, in 1960

=== White House years ===
When Kennedy was three years old, the family moved to the White House after her father was sworn in as president of the United States. Kennedy was often photographed riding her pony "Macaroni" around the White House grounds. One such photo in a news article inspired singer-songwriter Neil Diamond to write his song, "Sweet Caroline", which he revealed when performing it for Caroline's 50th birthday. As a small child, Kennedy received numerous gifts from dignitaries, including a puppy from Soviet Premier Nikita Khrushchev and a Yucatán pony from Vice President Lyndon B. Johnson. A short-lived comic strip was created about her, and she was the namesake of the British pirate radio station Radio Caroline, founded in 1964.

Historians described Caroline's childhood personality as "a trifle remote and a bit shy at times" yet "remarkably unspoiled." "She's too young to realize all these luxuries", her paternal grandmother, Rose Kennedy, said of her. "She probably thinks it's natural for children to go off in their own airplanes. But she is with her cousins, and some of them dance and swim better than she. They do not allow her to take special precedence. Little children accept things".

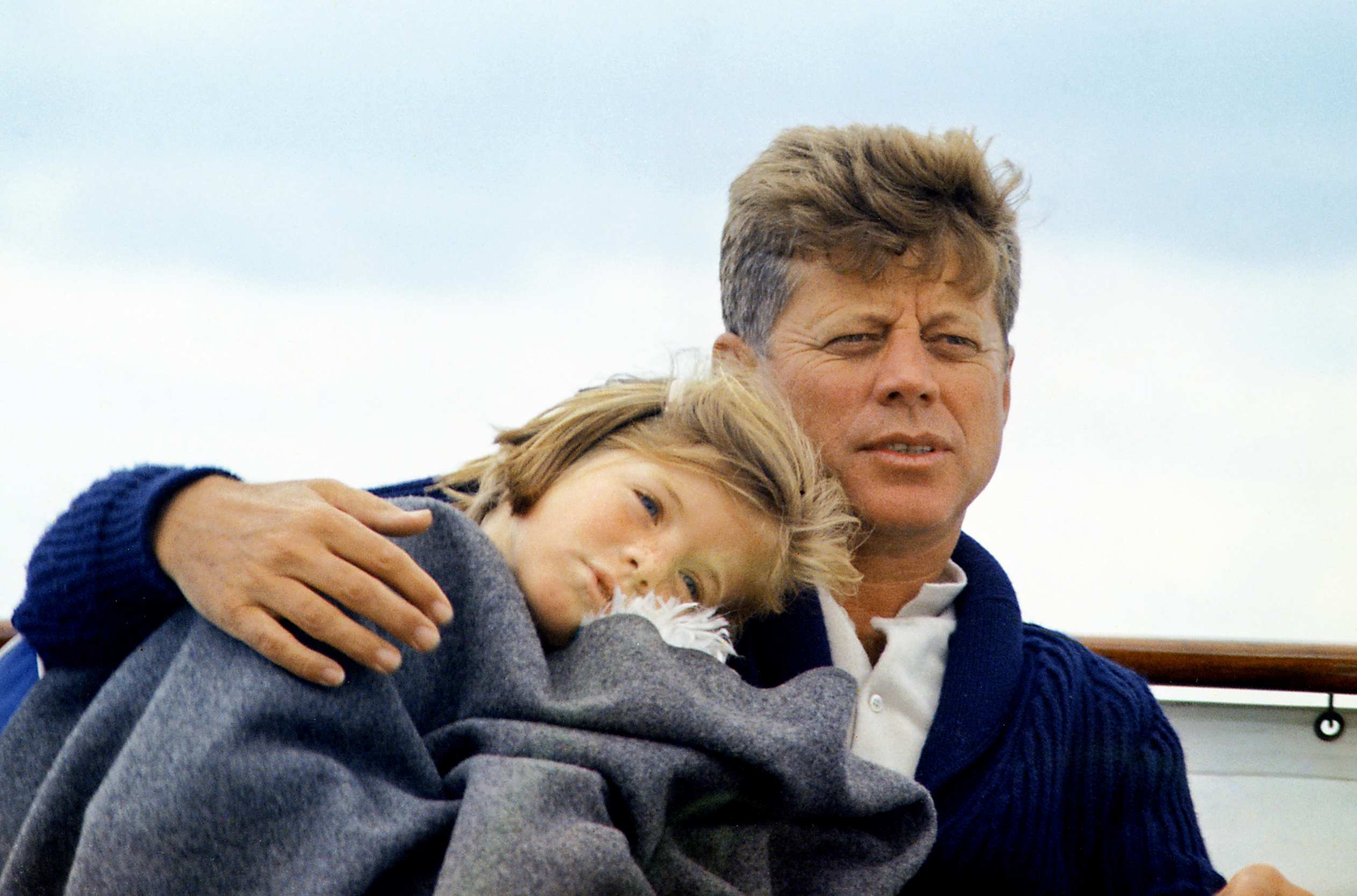
Kennedy with her father aboard the yacht Honey Fitz off the coast of Hyannis, Massachusetts at age five, August 25, 1963

When Kennedy's father was assassinated in 1963, nanny Maud Shaw took her and John Jr. from the White House to the home of their maternal grandmother, Janet Bouvier Auchincloss, who insisted that Shaw be the one to tell Kennedy about her father's assassination. That evening, Kennedy and John Jr. returned to the White House, and while Kennedy was in bed, Shaw broke the news to her. Shaw soon found out that Jacqueline had wanted to be the one to tell the two children, which caused a rift between Shaw and Jacqueline. On December 6, two weeks after the assassination, Jacqueline, Caroline, and John Jr. moved out of the White House and returned to Georgetown. Their new home became a tourist attraction, and the family left Georgetown the following year. They later moved to a penthouse apartment at 1040 Fifth Avenue on the Upper East Side.

=== Later childhood years ===
In 1967, Kennedy christened the U.S. Navy aircraft carrier USS John F. Kennedy in a widely publicized ceremony in Newport News, Virginia. Over that summer, Jacqueline took the children on a six-week "sentimental journey" to Ireland, where they met President Éamon de Valera and visited the Kennedy ancestral home at Dunganstown. In the midst of the trip, Caroline and John were surrounded by a large number of press photographers while playing in a pond. The incident caused their mother to telephone Ireland's Department of External Affairs and request the issuing of a statement that she and the children wanted to be left in peace. As a result of the request, further attempts by press photographers to photograph the threesome ended with arrests by local police and the photographers being jailed.

Caroline and John Jr.'s uncle Robert F. Kennedy became a major presence in both children's lives following their father's assassination, and Kennedy saw Robert as a surrogate father. However, when Robert was assassinated in 1968, Jacqueline sought a means of protecting her children, stating: "I hate this country. I despise America and I don't want my children to live here anymore. If they're killing Kennedys, my kids are the number one targets. I have the two main targets. I want to get out of this country". Jacqueline Kennedy married Greek shipping tycoon Aristotle Onassis several months later and she and the children moved to Skorpios, his Greek island. The next year, 11-year-old Caroline attended the funeral of her grandfather, Joseph P. Kennedy Sr. Her cousin, David, asked Caroline about her feelings towards her stepfather, and Caroline replied, "I don't like him".

In 1970, Jacqueline wrote her brother-in-law Ted Kennedy a letter stating that Caroline had been without a godfather since Robert Kennedy's death and would like Ted to assume the role. Ted began making regular trips from Washington to New York to see Caroline, where she was in school. In 1971, Caroline returned to the White House for the first time since her father's assassination when she was invited by President Richard Nixon to view the official portrait of her father.

Onassis died in March 1975, and Caroline returned to Skorpios for his funeral. A few days later, she and her mother and brother attended the presentation by French president Valéry Giscard d'Estaing of the Legion of Honor award to her aunt, Eunice Kennedy Shriver. Later that year, Kennedy was visiting London to complete a year-long art course at the Sotheby's auction house, when an IRA car bomb placed under the car of her hosts, Conservative MP Sir Hugh Fraser and his wife, Antonia, exploded shortly before she and the Frasers were due to leave for their daily drive to Sotheby's. Kennedy had not yet left the house, but a neighbor, oncologist Professor Gordon Hamilton Fairley, was passing by when he was walking his dog and was killed by the explosion.

== Education and personal life ==
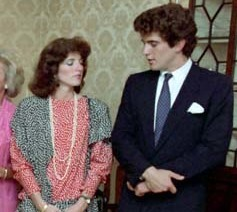
Kennedy with brother John Jr. in Washington in 1985

Kennedy began her education with kindergarten classes in the White House organized by her mother. Before the family's move to New York, Kennedy was registered at Stone Ridge School of the Sacred Heart. She attended the Brearley School and Convent of the Sacred Heart in Manhattan, and later graduated in 1975 from Concord Academy in Massachusetts. Kennedy was a photographer's assistant at the 1976 Winter Olympics in Innsbruck, Austria. In 1977, she worked as a summer intern at the New York Daily News, earning $156 a week ($829 in 2025 dollars), "fetching coffee for harried editors and reporters, changing typewriter ribbons and delivering messages." Kennedy reportedly "sat on a bench alone for two hours the first day before other employees even said hello to her"; and, according to Richard Licata, a former News reporter, "Everyone was too scared." Kennedy also wrote for Rolling Stone about visiting Graceland shortly after the death of Elvis Presley.

In 1980, Kennedy earned a Bachelor of Arts degree from Harvard University's Radcliffe College in fine arts, including courses on ancient Greek art, architecture and literature. During college, she had "considered becoming a photojournalist, but soon realized she could never make her living observing other people because they were too busy watching her." After graduating, Kennedy was hired as a research assistant in the Film and Television Department of the Metropolitan Museum of Art in New York. She later became a "liaison officer between the museum staff and outside producers and directors shooting footage at the museum", helping coordinate the Sesame Street special Don't Eat the Pictures. For the television special, Kennedy was credited as coordinating producer for the museum.

On December 4, 1984, Kennedy was threatened when a man telephoned the museum and stated his name and address while reporting that a bomb had been planted there. Three days later, he was arrested for the threat. In 1988, Kennedy earned a Juris Doctor from Columbia Law School, graduating in the top 10 percent of her class. The following year, Kennedy passed the New York State bar exam.

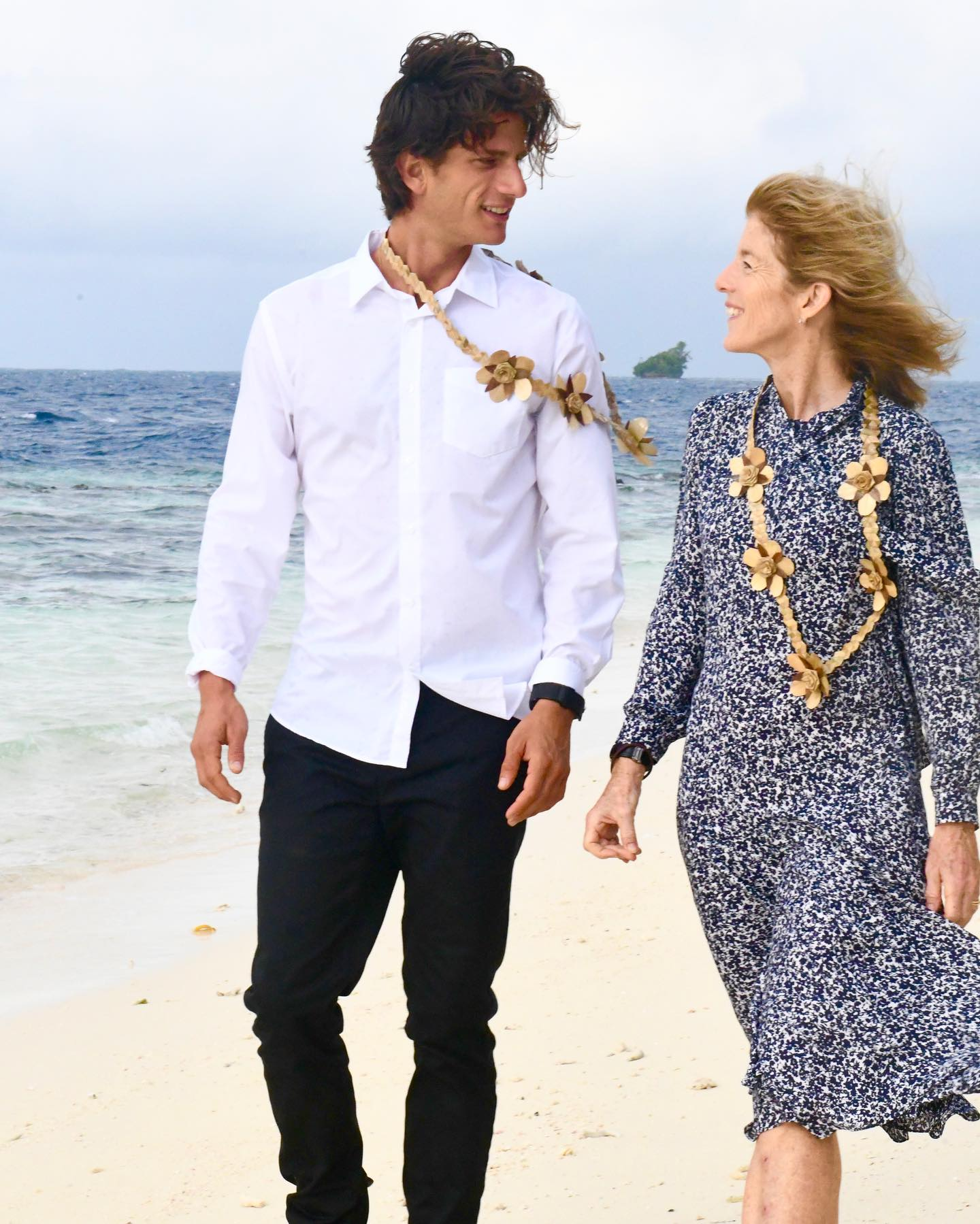
Kennedy with her son Jack at Kennedy Island in August 2023

Kennedy was romantically linked to many famous men, including Mark Shand, Sebastian Taylor, and Jonathan Guinness (of the Guinness family). While working at the Met, Kennedy met her future husband, exhibit designer Edwin Schlossberg. They married in 1986 at Our Lady of Victory Church in Centerville, Massachusetts. Kennedy's first cousin, Maria Shriver, served as the matron of honor, and Ted walked her down the aisle. Kennedy did not change her surname at the time she married. Kennedy has three children: Rose Kennedy Schlossberg (born 1988), Tatiana Celia Kennedy Schlossberg (1990–2025), and John Bouvier Kennedy Schlossberg, known as Jack (born 1993).

Raised in Manhattan and somewhat separated from their Hyannis Port, Massachusetts cousins, Caroline and John Jr. were very close, especially following their mother's death in 1994. After John Jr. died in a plane crash in 1999, Kennedy was the only remaining survivor of President Kennedy's immediate family, and she preferred not to have a public memorial service for her brother. Kennedy decided that his remains would be cremated, and his ashes scattered into the Atlantic Ocean off the coast of Martha's Vineyard, where John Jr. met his fate. John Jr. bequeathed Kennedy his half ownership of George magazine, but Kennedy believed that her brother would not have wanted the magazine to continue following his death, and the magazine ceased publication two years later.

Kennedy owns Red Gate Farm, her mother's 375-acre (152 ha) estate in Aquinnah, Massachusetts (formerly Gay Head) on Martha's Vineyard. The New York Daily News estimated Kennedy's net worth in 2008 at over $100 million. During her 2013 nomination to serve as ambassador to Japan, financial disclosure reports showed her net worth to be between $278 million and $500 million, including family trusts and commercial property in Chicago.

In 2023, Kennedy and her son Jack recreated and witnessed the famous 1.2-kilometre (0.75 mi) rescue swim that her father John F. Kennedy conducted as a United States naval lieutenant during World War 2 in the Pacific Ocean. She and Jack traveled to the Solomon Islands. JFK saved himself and his crew by swimming between Olasana Island and Naru Island and Plum Pudding Island after a Japanese destroyer rammed and sank his ship in 1943.

In January 2025, Kennedy publicly spoke out against her cousin Robert F. Kennedy Jr.'s nomination for Secretary of the Department of Health and Human Services, in a letter and video to US senators ahead of confirmation proceedings. Within this letter, Kennedy labelled her cousin a "predator" and stated his views and actions on vaccinations to be "hypocritical" and financially motivated. The letter was also posted on her son Jack's Instagram page, and was supported by other members of the Kennedy family.

On December 30, 2025, her daughter Tatiana died from leukemia at the age of 35. Her son Jack is the most public of her children.

== Career ==
Kennedy is an attorney, writer, and editor who has served on the boards of numerous non-profit organizations. With Ellen Alderman, she co-wrote the book, In Our Defense: The Bill of Rights In Action, which was published in 1991. During an interview regarding the volume, Kennedy explained that the two wanted to show why the Fourth Amendment to the United States Constitution was written. She attended the Robin Hood Foundation annual breakfast on December 7, 1999. Her brother, John Jr., had been committed to the organization, which she spoke of at the event. In 2000, Kennedy supported Al Gore for the presidency and mentioned feeling a kinship with him since their fathers served together in the Senate. She spoke at the 2000 Democratic National Convention which was held in Los Angeles, California, the first time since the 1960 Democratic National Convention, where her father had been nominated by the Democratic Party for the presidency.

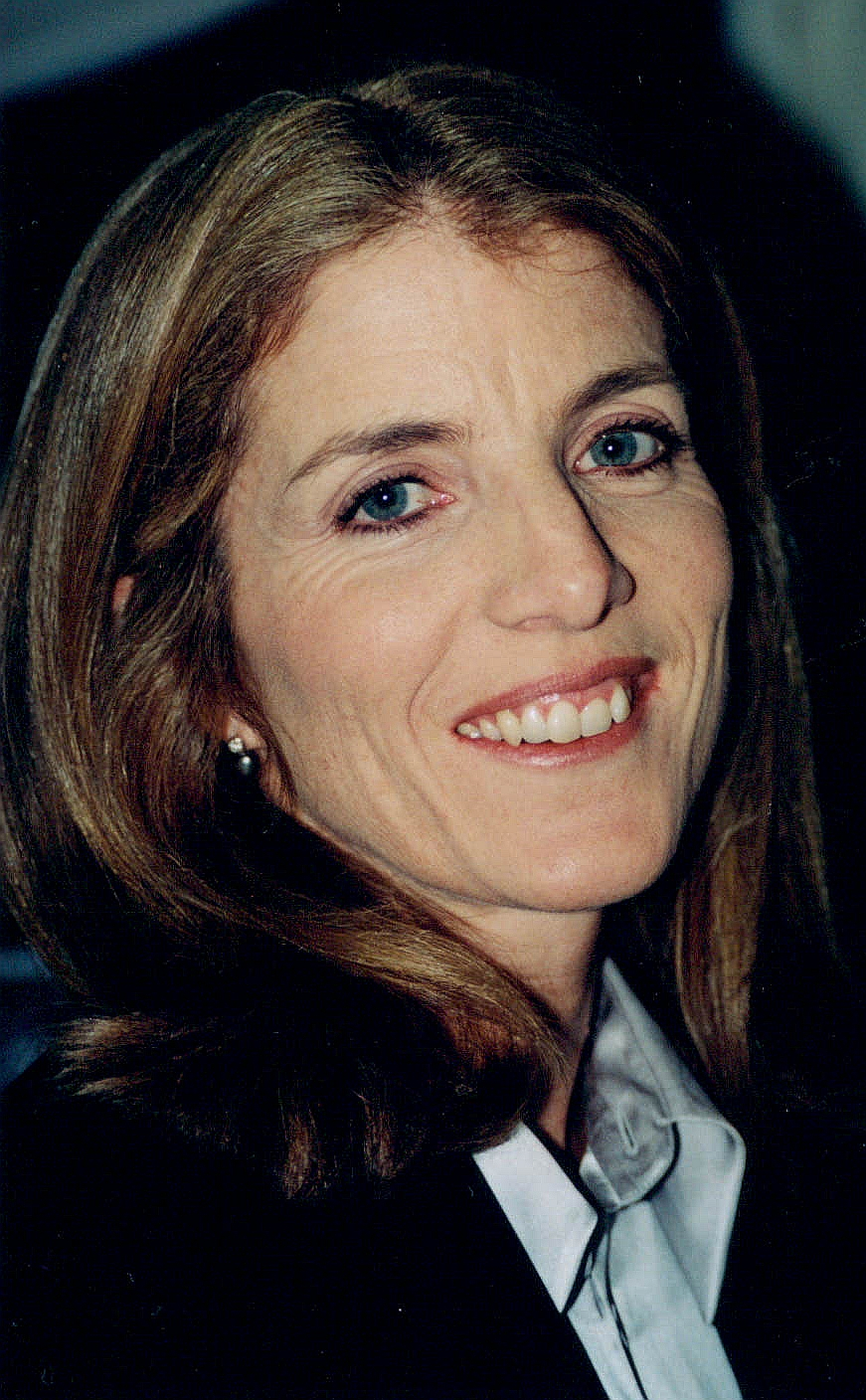
Kennedy in 1999

External videos
- Booknotes interview with Ellen Alderman and Caroline Kennedy on In Our Defense, April 28, 1991, C-SPAN

From 2002 through 2004, Kennedy worked as director of the Office of Strategic Partnerships for the New York City Department of Education, appointed by School Chancellor Joel Klein. The three-day-a-week job paid Kennedy a salary of $1 and had the goal of raising private money for the New York City public schools. She helped raise more than $65 million. Kennedy served as one of two vice chairs of the board of directors of The Fund for Public Schools and is currently honorary director of the fund. She has also served on the board of trustees of Concord Academy, which Kennedy attended as a teen.

Kennedy and other members of her family created the Profile in Courage Award in 1989. The award is given to a public official or officials whose actions demonstrate politically courageous leadership in the spirit of John F. Kennedy's book, Profiles in Courage. In 2001, she presented the award to former president Gerald Ford for his controversial pardon of former president Richard M. Nixon almost 30 years prior. Kennedy is also president of the Kennedy Library Foundation and an adviser to the Harvard Institute of Politics. She is a member of the New York and Washington, D.C., bar associations. Kennedy is also a member of the boards of directors of the Commission on Presidential Debates and the NAACP Legal Defense and Educational Fund, and is an honorary chair of the American Ballet Theatre. She represented her family at the funeral services of former presidents Ronald Reagan and Gerald Ford and former First Ladies Lady Bird Johnson, Nancy Reagan and Barbara Bush. Kennedy also represented her family at the dedication of the Bill Clinton Presidential Center and Park in Little Rock, Arkansas, in November 2004, and at the dedication of the George H. W. Bush Presidential Library in 1997. Kennedy attended the 50th-anniversary ceremony of the March on Washington on August 28, 2013.

=== 2008 and 2012 presidential elections ===
2008 United States presidential election
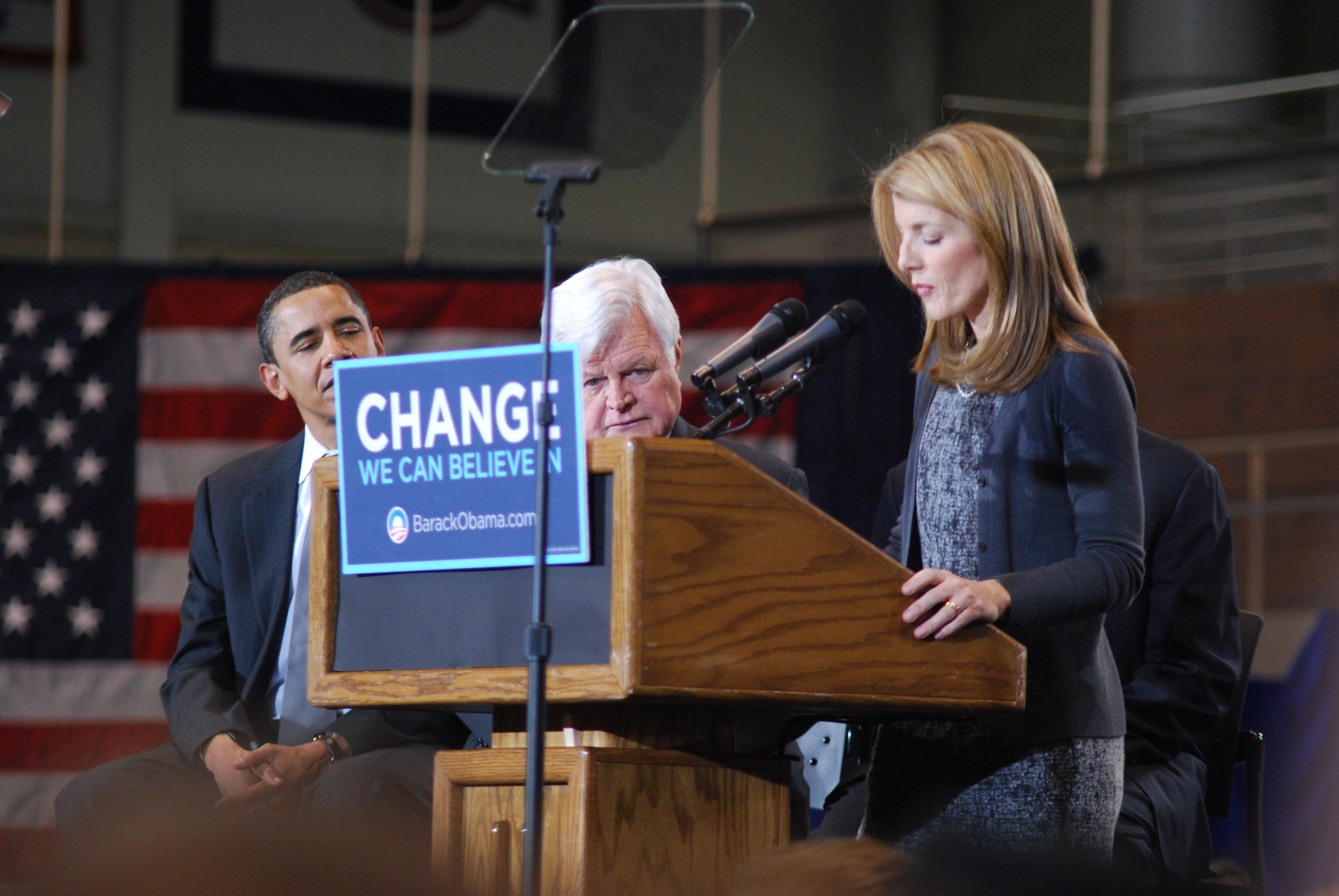
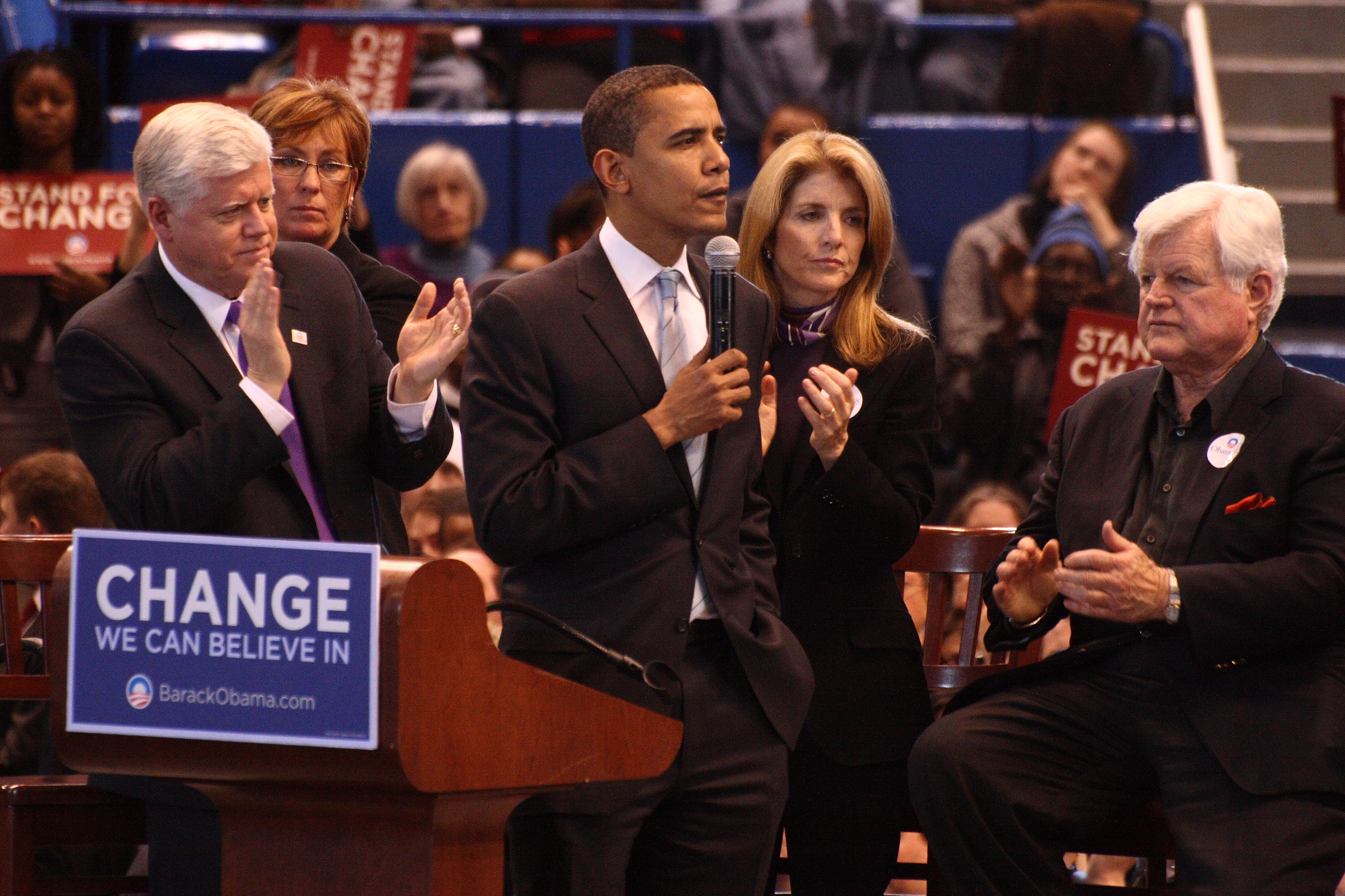
Kennedy on the presidential campaign trail supporting Barack Obama

On January 27, 2008, Kennedy announced in a New York Times op-ed piece entitled, "A President Like My Father," that she would endorse Barack Obama in the 2008 U.S. presidential election. Her concluding lines were: "I have never had a president who inspired me the way people tell me that my father inspired them. But for the first time, I believe I have found the man who could be that president—not just for me, but for a new generation of Americans."

Federal Election Commission records show that Kennedy contributed $2,300 to the Hillary Rodham Clinton presidential campaign committee on June 29, 2007. She previously contributed a total of $5,000 to Clinton's 2006 senatorial campaign. On September 18, 2007, she contributed $2,300 to Barack Obama's presidential campaign committee.

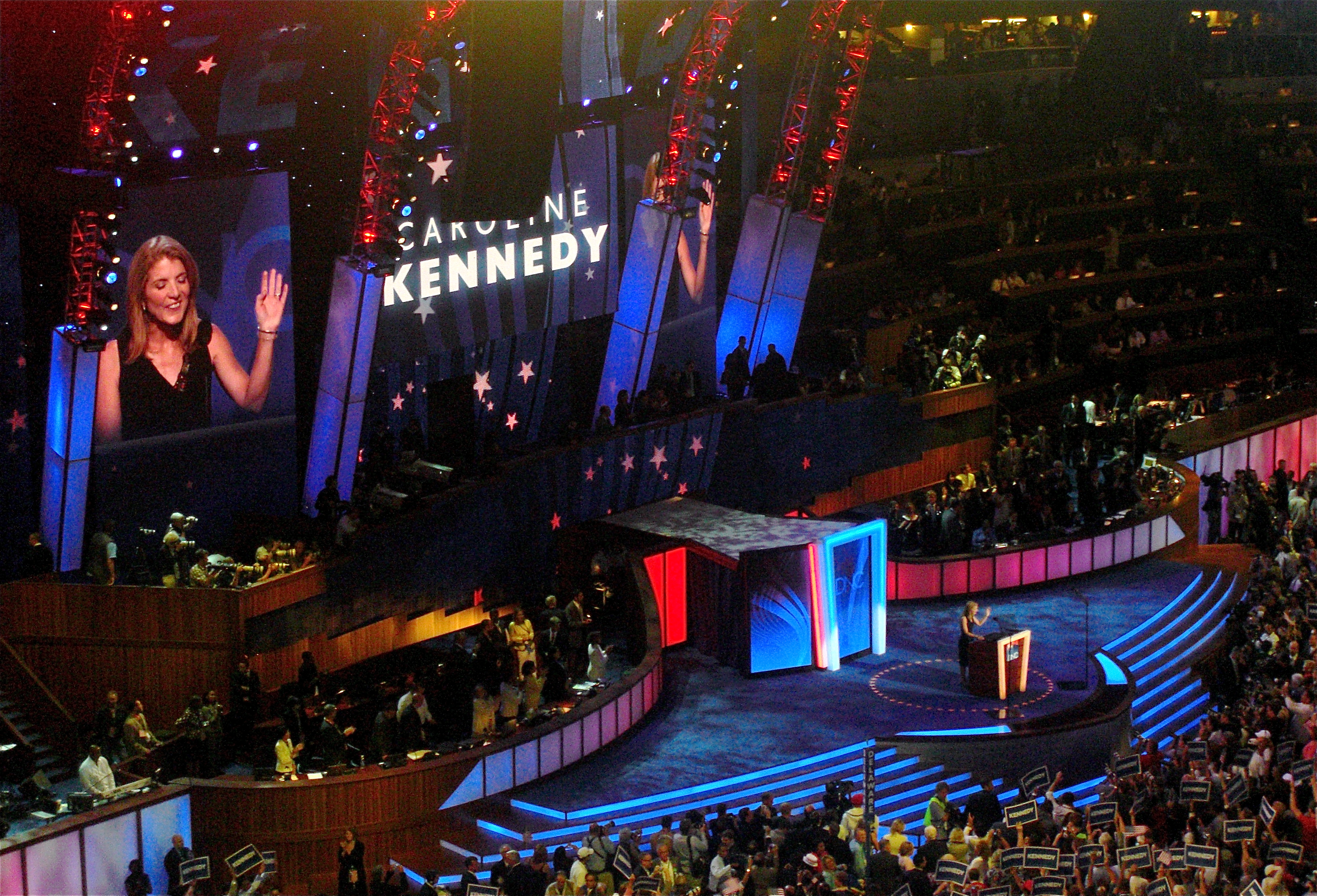
Kennedy spoke during the first night of the 2008 Democratic National Convention in Denver, Colorado, on August 25, 2008, introducing her uncle, Senator Ted Kennedy.

On June 4, 2008, Obama named Kennedy, along with Jim Johnson (who withdrew one week later) and Eric Holder, to co-chair his Vice Presidential Search Committee. Filmmaker Michael Moore called on Kennedy to "Pull a Cheney", and name herself as Obama's vice presidential running mate (Dick Cheney headed George W. Bush's vice presidential vetting committee in 2000—Cheney himself was chosen for the job). On August 23, Obama announced that Senator Joe Biden of Delaware would be his running mate. Kennedy addressed the 2008 Democratic National Convention in Denver, introducing a tribute film about her uncle, Senator Ted Kennedy. The Topps trading card company memorialized Kennedy's involvement in the campaign by featuring her on a card in a set commemorating Obama's road to the White House.

Kennedy was among the 35 national co-chairs of Obama's 2012 re-election campaign. On June 27, 2012, Kennedy made appearances in Nashua and Manchester, New Hampshire, to campaign for the re-election of President Obama.

There was media speculation that she might become a possible candidate for the 2020 Presidential primaries and election but this did not come to pass.

=== United States Senate seat ===
In December 2008, Kennedy expressed interest in the United States Senate seat occupied by Hillary Clinton, who had been selected to become Secretary of State. This seat was to be filled through 2010 by appointment of New York Governor David Paterson. This same seat was held by Kennedy's uncle Robert F. Kennedy from January 1965 until his assassination in June 1968, when he was a candidate for the Democratic presidential nomination. Kennedy's appointment was supported by Congresswoman Louise Slaughter, State Assemblyman Vito Lopez, New York City mayor Michael Bloomberg, and former New York City Mayor Ed Koch.

She was criticized for not voting in a number of Democratic primaries and general elections since registering in 1988 in New York City and for not providing details about her political views. In response, Kennedy released a statement through a spokeswoman that outlined some of her political views including that she supported legislation legalizing same-sex marriage, was pro-choice, against the death penalty, for restoring the Federal Assault Weapons Ban, and believed the North American Free Trade Agreement (NAFTA) should be re-examined. On foreign policy, her spokeswoman reiterated that Kennedy opposed the Iraq War from the beginning as well as that she believed that Jerusalem should be the undivided capital city of Israel. Kennedy declined to make disclosures of her financial dealings or other personal matters to the press, stating that she would not release the information publicly unless she were selected by Governor Paterson. She did complete a confidential 28-page disclosure questionnaire required of hopefuls, reported to include extensive financial information.

In an interview with the Associated Press, Kennedy acknowledged that she would need to prove herself. "Going into politics is something people have asked me about forever", Kennedy said. "When this opportunity came along, which was sort of unexpected, I thought, 'Well, maybe now. How about now?' [I'll have to] work twice as hard as anybody else..... I am an unconventional choice..... We're starting to see there are many ways into public life and public service". In late December 2008, Kennedy drew criticism from several media outlets for lacking clarity in interviews, and for using the phrase "you know" 168 times during a 30-minute interview with NY1.

Shortly before midnight on January 22, 2009, Kennedy released a statement that she was withdrawing from consideration for the seat due to "personal reasons". Kennedy declined to expand upon the reasons that led to her decision. One day after Kennedy's withdrawal, Paterson announced his selection of Representative Kirsten Gillibrand to fill the Senate seat.

=== Vatican appointment controversy ===
In April 2009, Kennedy was widely reported to have been rejected as the United States Ambassador to the Holy See, a position she had not publicly sought. The alleged rejection was said to have been due to her position in favor of abortion rights. The reports were later debunked by Holy See Press Director Federico Lombardi, who said no such nomination had been received by the Vatican.

=== United States Ambassador to Japan (2013–2017) ===
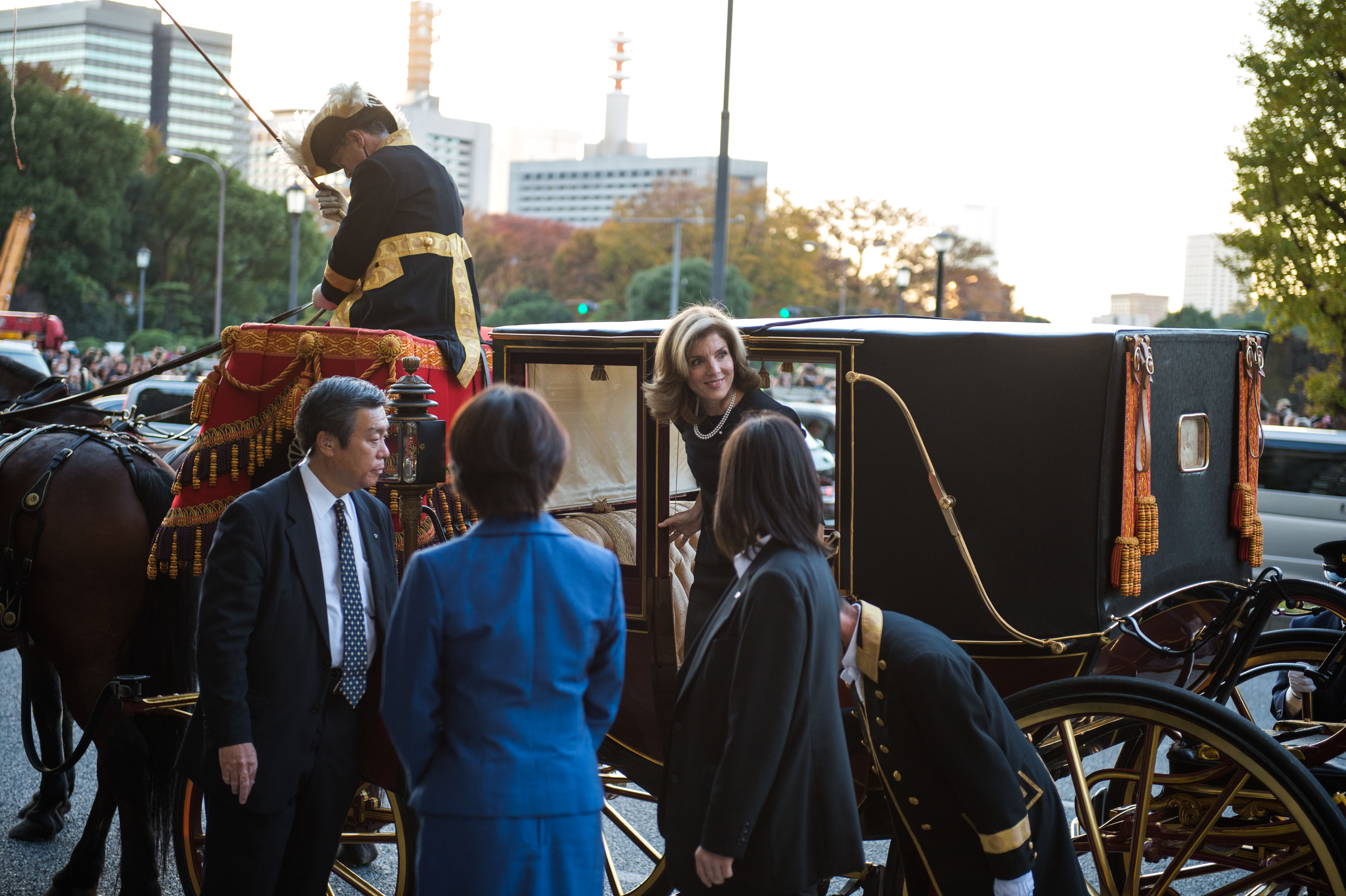
Kennedy returns from Tokyo Imperial Palace after presenting her credentials on November 19, 2013.

On July 24, 2013, President Obama announced Kennedy as his nominee to be United States Ambassador to Japan to succeed Ambassador John Roos. The prospective nomination was first reported in February 2013 and, in mid-July 2013, formal diplomatic agreement to the appointment was reportedly received from the Japanese government.

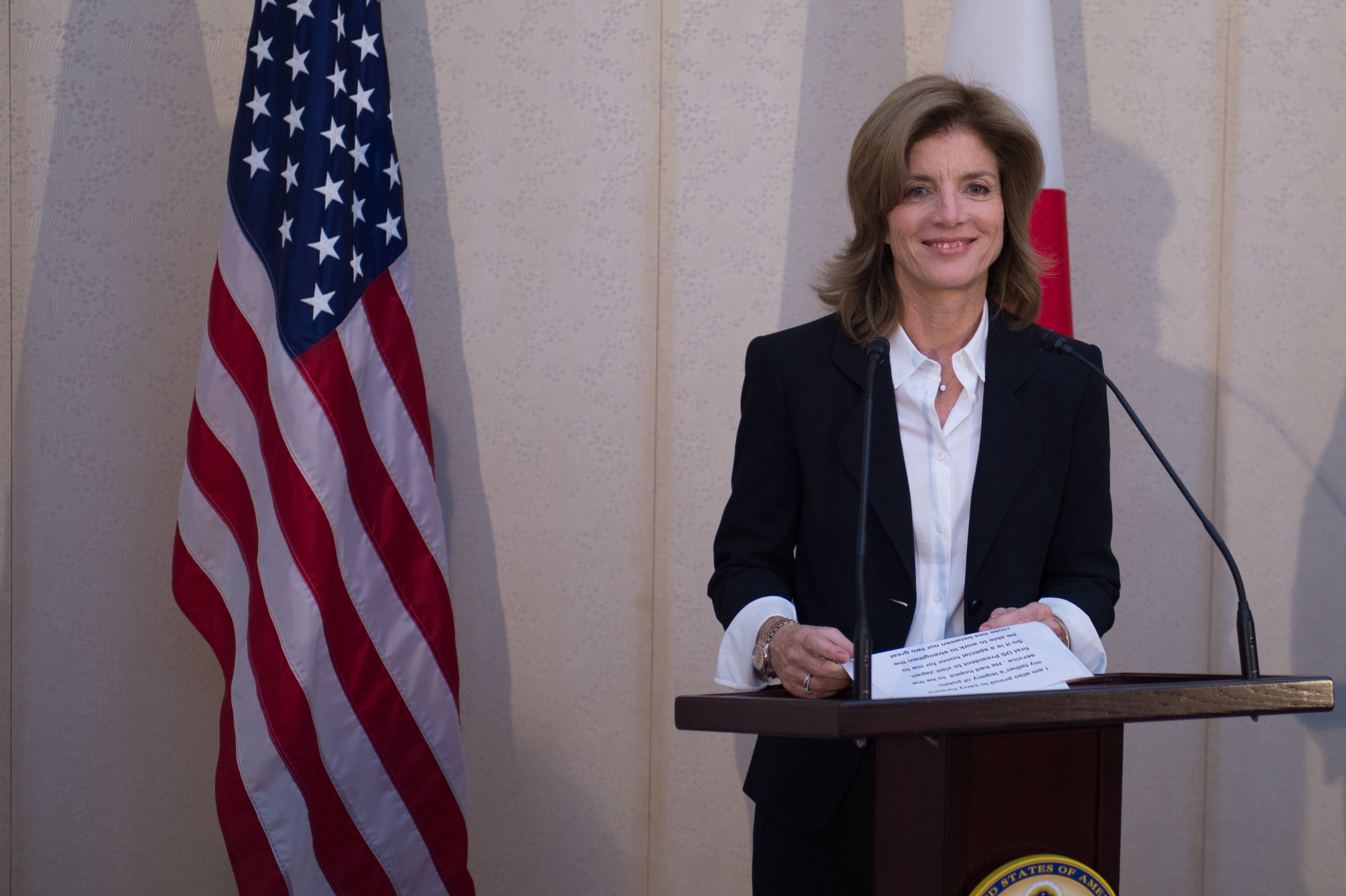
Kennedy makes her first statement after arriving at the Narita International Airport on November 15, 2013.

On September 19, 2013, Kennedy sat before the Senate Foreign Relations Committee and responded to questions regarding her potential appointment. Kennedy explained that her focus would be military ties, trade, and student exchange if she was selected for the position. On September 30, 2013, the committee favorably reported her nomination to the Senate floor. She was confirmed on October 16, 2013, by voice vote as the first female U.S. Ambassador to Japan and was sworn in by Secretary of State John Kerry on November 12. Kennedy arrived in Japan on November 15 and met Japanese diplomats three days later. On November 19, NHK showed live coverage of Kennedy's arrival at the Imperial Palace to present her diplomatic credentials to Emperor Akihito.

==== Tenure ====
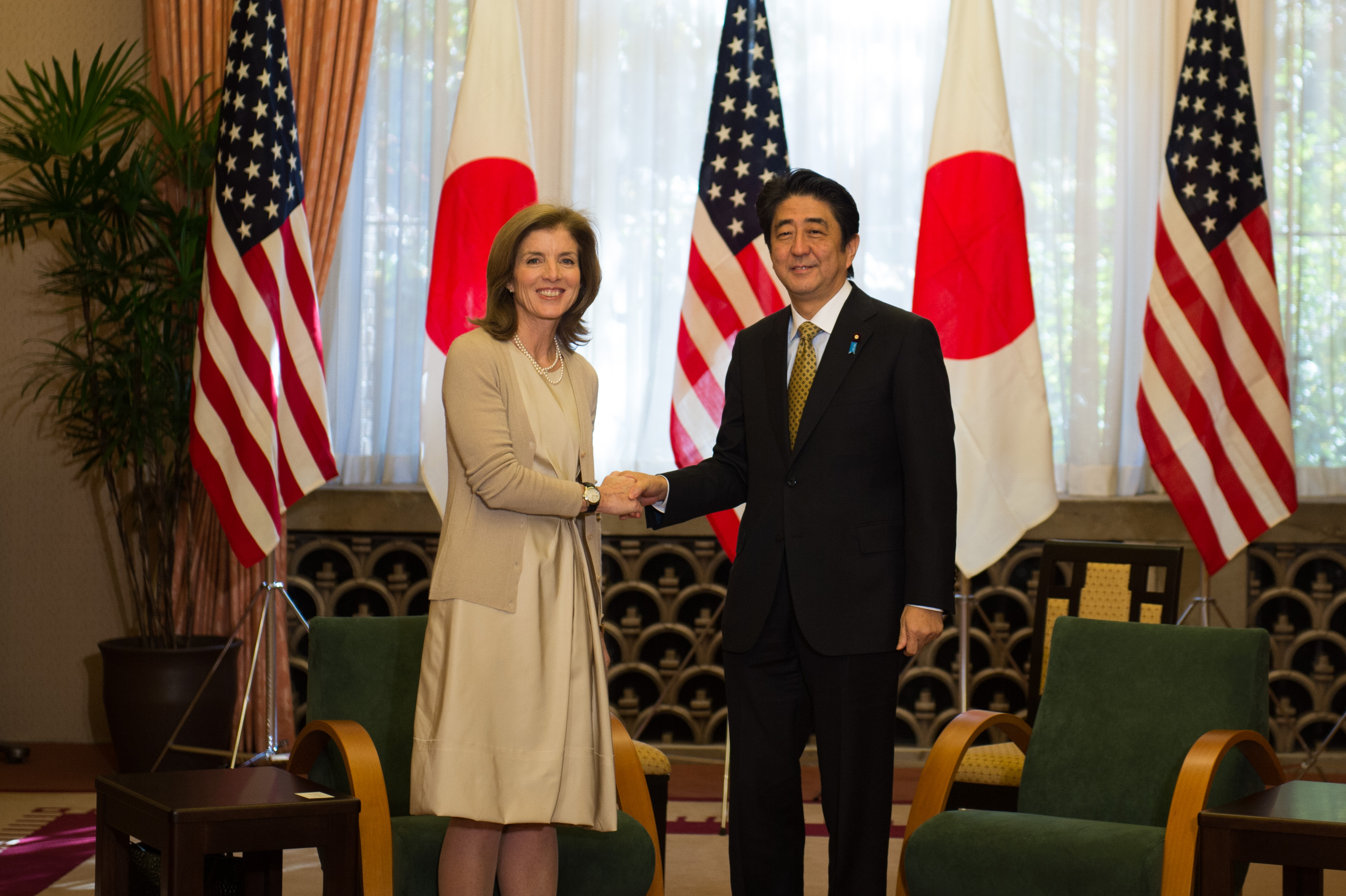
Kennedy meets with Japanese Prime Minister Shinzo Abe in 2013.

In December 2013, she visited Nagasaki to meet with survivors of the 1945 atomic bombing of that city. On August 5, 2014, she attended a memorial ceremony for victims of the atomic bombing of Hiroshima; she was the second U.S. ambassador to attend the annual memorial. This was her second visit to Hiroshima, having visited in 1978 with her uncle, Senator Ted Kennedy.

In February 2014, Kennedy visited the southern Japanese island of Okinawa, the site of the large military bases of United States Forces Japan, and was received by protests against the American military presence and placards with "no base" written on them. The protesters are opposed to the American military presence due to various concerns over sexual assaults and the environmental impact of the base. Kennedy subsequently met with Okinawa's governor, Hirokazu Nakaima, who was re-elected in 2010 in opposition to the base. She pledged to reduce the burden of the American military presence in Okinawa.

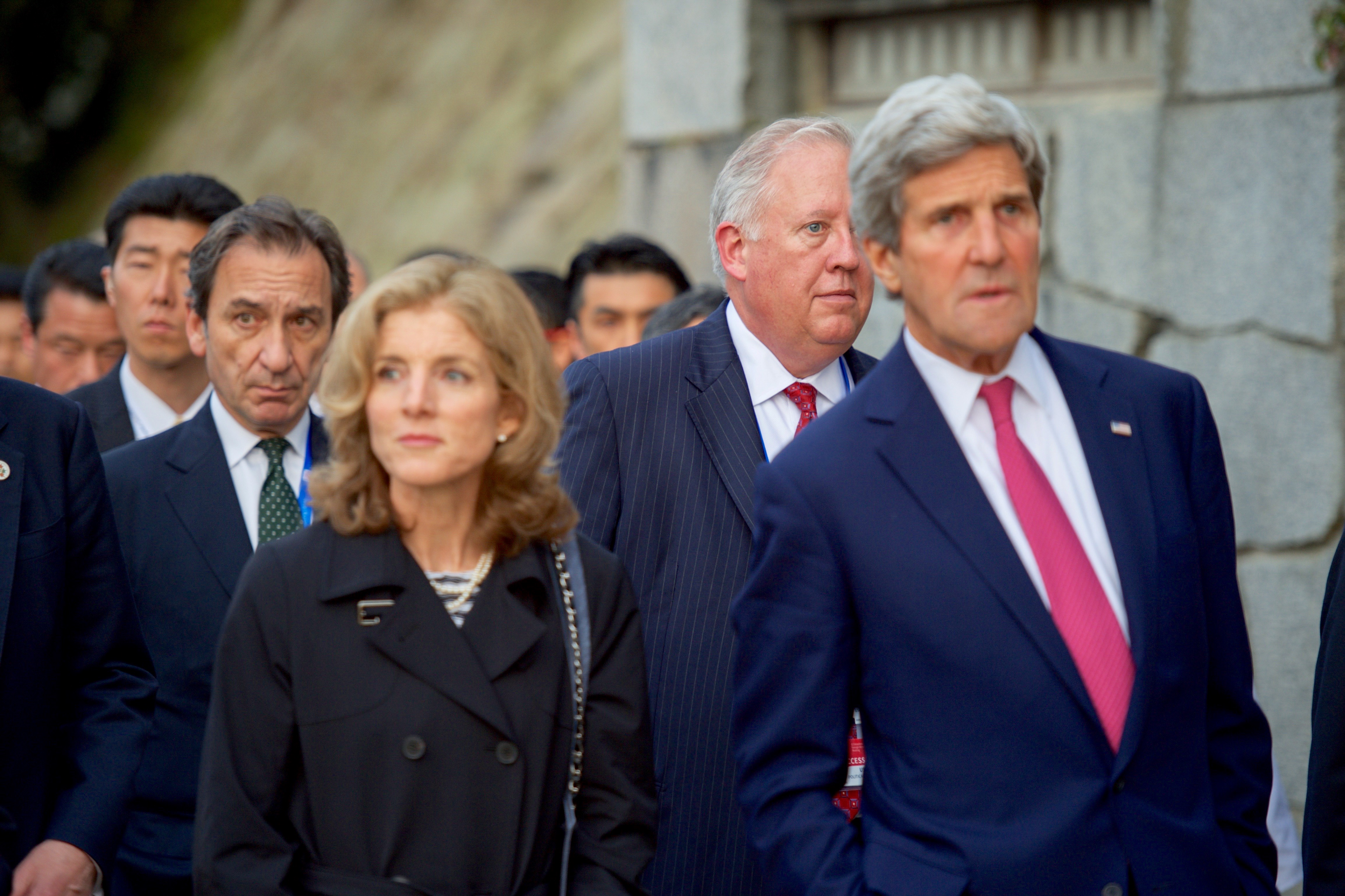
Kennedy and U.S. Secretary of State John Kerry in Hiroshima in April 2016

In April 2015, Kennedy visited the Hiroshima Peace Memorial Museum, which displayed the impact from the 1945 atomic bombing. Kennedy called her visit a "solemn honor" and also planted dogwood trees on a road, participating in a U.S. project to spread 3,000 dogwood trees across Japan.

On August 6, 2015, Kennedy accompanied US Under Secretary of State for Arms Control and International Security Rose Gottemoeller to the memorial for the atomic bombing of Hiroshima, Japan by the United States in World War II. It marked the 70th anniversary of the bombing, and Gottemoeller became the first senior American official to attend the annual memorial. Kennedy was only the second US ambassador to attend. With representatives of 100 countries in attendance, Japanese prime minister Shinzō Abe reiterated Japan's official support for the abolition of nuclear weapons.

On August 15, 2015, Kennedy was named sponsor for the second USS John F. Kennedy (CVN-79) a Gerald R. Ford class supercarrier named for her father. Kennedy christened CVN-79 on December 7, 2019, the 78th anniversary of the Attack on Pearl Harbor. Traditionally, a person only sponsors one United States navy ship; however, Kennedy is one of the rare exceptions who sponsored two ships.

Kennedy resigned as the United States Ambassador to Japan shortly before Donald Trump was sworn in as the 45th President of the United States. She formally left Japan as Ambassador on January 18, 2017. In recognition of her service, Kennedy was awarded Japan's Grand Cordon of the Order of the Rising Sun in 2021.

=== United States Ambassador to Australia (2022–2024) ===
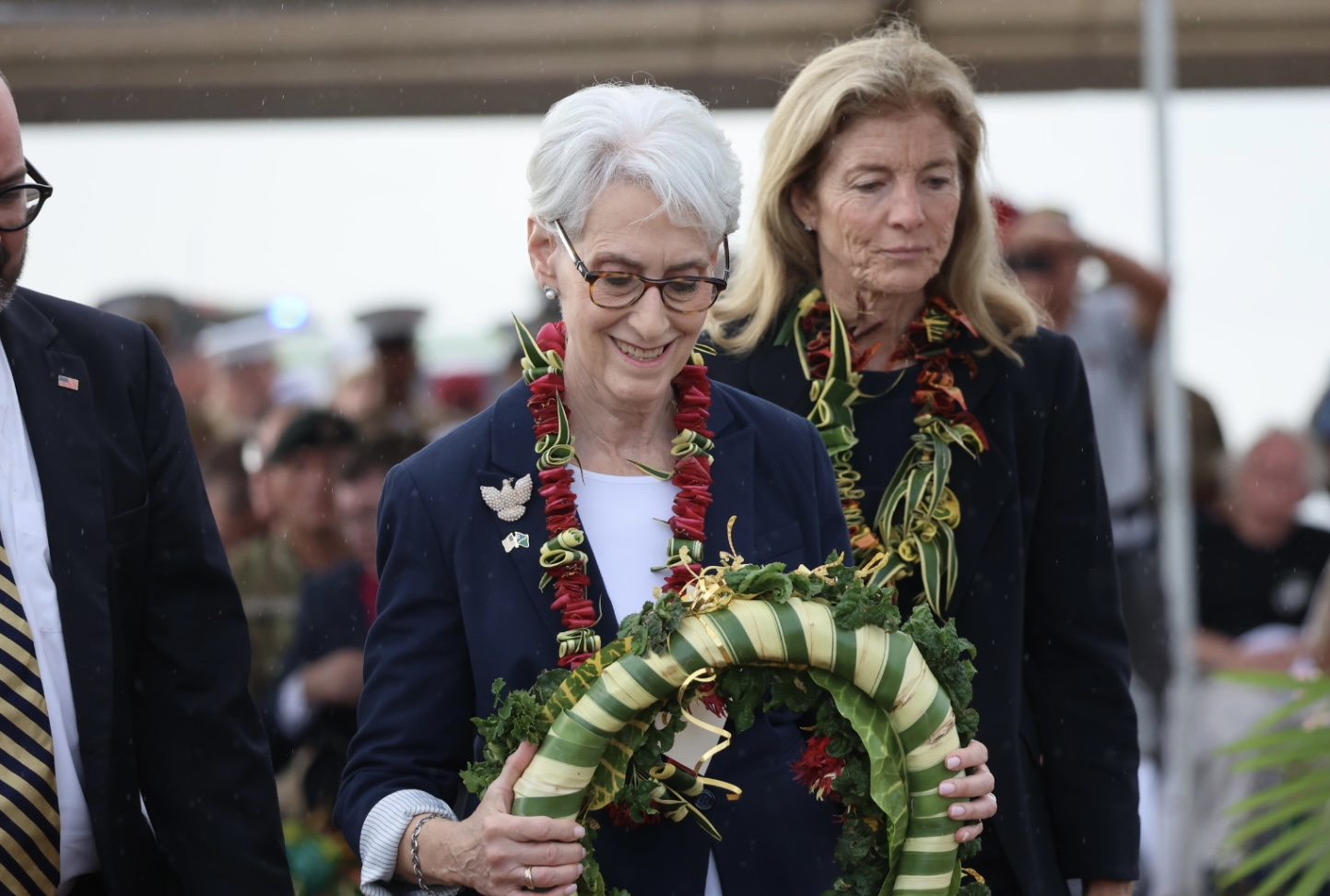
Kennedy and U.S. Deputy Secretary of State Wendy Sherman at a memorial in Guadalcanal, Solomon Islands in August 2022

On December 15, 2021, President Joe Biden nominated Kennedy to be the United States Ambassador to Australia. Hearings on her nomination were held before the Senate Foreign Relations Committee on April 7, 2022. The committee favorably reported her to the Senate floor on May 4, 2022. She was confirmed by the Senate on May 5, 2022, by voice vote. Kennedy was officially sworn in on June 10, 2022. She presented her credentials to Governor-General of Australia David Hurley on July 25, 2022.

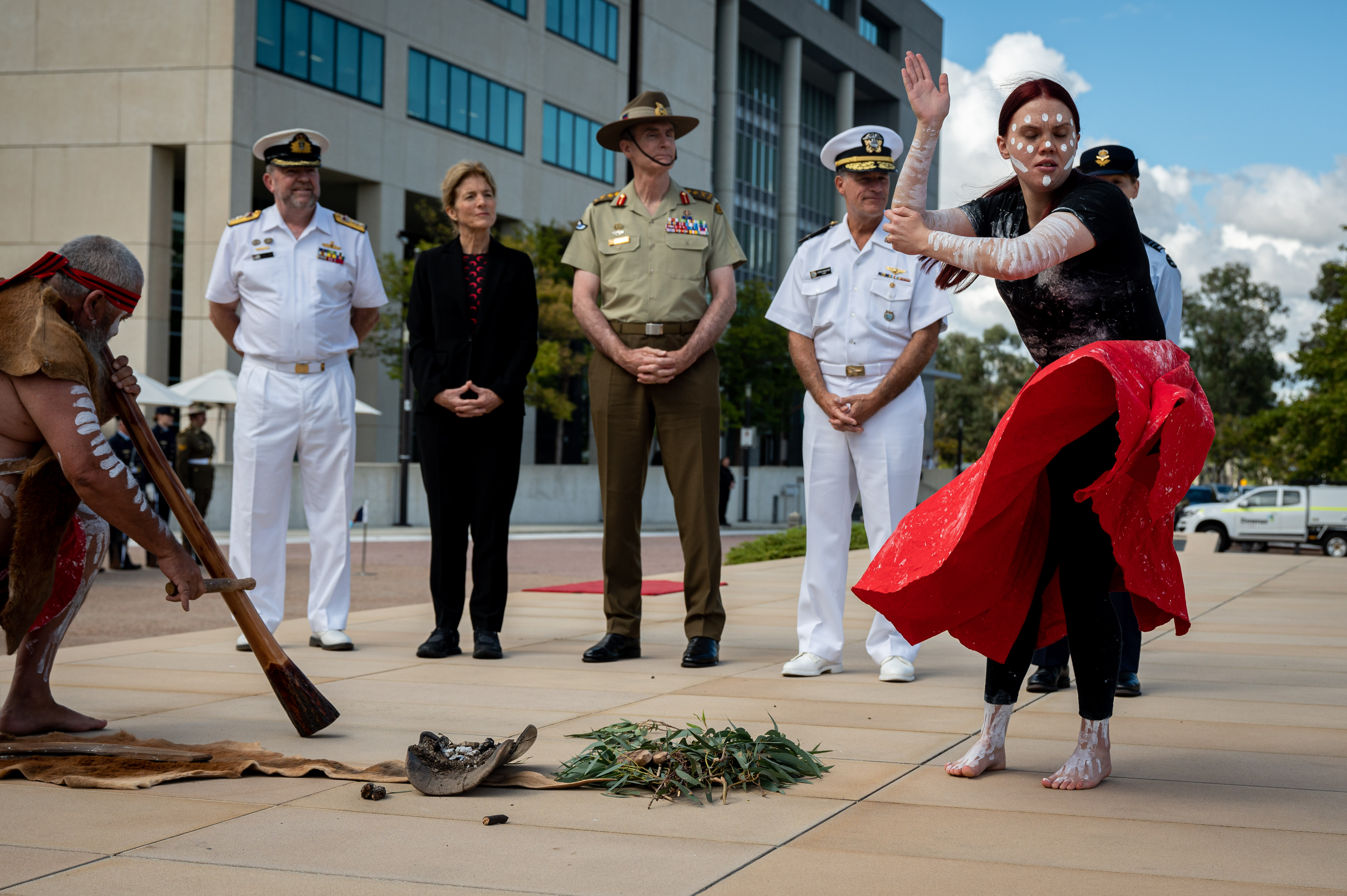
Welcome to Country Kennedy, with Gen. Angus Campbell and Adm. John C. Aquilino on the right, 8 April 2024, in Canberra

At her arrival press conference in July 2022, she called out a male journalist for speaking over a female reporter.

While ambassador, Kennedy worked to secure support in Congress to pass legislation to allow for the transfer of nuclear-powered submarines to Australia (under AUKUS).

In August 2023, Kennedy suggested the potential for "resolution" and a plea bargain deal, to resolve the extradition proceedings of journalist Julian Assange (an Australian citizen) from the United Kingdom to the United States.

In September 2024, Kennedy announced she would leave her ambassadorial position regardless of the result of the presidential election.

== Publications ==
Kennedy and Ellen Alderman have co-written two books on civil liberties:

- In Our Defense: The Bill of Rights in Action (1991)
- The Right to Privacy (1995)

Kennedy has edited these New York Times best-selling volumes:

- The Best-Loved Poems of Jacqueline Kennedy Onassis (2001);
- Profiles in Courage for Our Time (2002);
- A Patriot's Handbook (2003);
- A Family of Poems: My Favorite Poetry for Children (2005).

She is also the author of A Family Christmas, a collection of poems, prose, and personal notes from her family history (2007, ISBN 978-1-4013-2227-4). In April 2011, a new collection of poetry, She Walks in Beauty – A Woman's Journey Through Poems, edited and introduced by Kennedy, was published. She launched the book at the John F. Kennedy Presidential Library and Museum at Columbia Point, Dorchester, Massachusetts.

Diplomatic posts
Preceded by John Roos	United States Ambassador to Japan; 2013–2017	Succeeded by William F. Hagerty
Preceded by Arthur B. Culvahouse Jr.	United States Ambassador to Australia; 2022–2024	Vacant
