= Crisis: Behind a Presidential Commitment =

- Directed by: Robert Drew
- Produced by: Robert Drew; Gregory Shuker
- Starring: John F. Kennedy; George Wallace; Robert F. Kennedy; Vivian Malone; James Hood; Nicholas Katzenbach; James Lipscomb (narrator)
- Cinematography: Richard Leacock; D.A. Pennebaker; James Lipscomb; Hope Ryden
- Edited by: De Nosworthy; Nicholas T. Proferes
- Production companies: ABC News; Drew Associates
- Distributed by: Direct Cinema Limited
- Release date: October 28, 1963
- Running time: 52 minutes
- Country: United States
- Language: English

Crisis: Behind a Presidential Commitment is an 1963 American direct cinema documentary film directed by Robert Drew. The film centers on the University of Alabama's "Stand in the Schoolhouse Door" integration crisis of June 1963. Drew and the other filmmakers, including D.A. Pennebaker and Richard Leacock, were given expanded access to key areas, including United States President John F. Kennedy's Oval Office and the homes of United States Attorney General Robert F. Kennedy and Governor George Wallace of Alabama. The film first aired on the American Broadcasting Company (ABC) as an installment of Close-Up! four months after the incident, on October 28, 1963. It was selected for preservation in the National Film Registry by the Library of Congress on December 28, 2011.

== Synopsis ==
Shot primarily during a two-day period surrounding the University of Alabama integration crisis on June 11, 1963, the film follows President John F. Kennedy, Attorney General Robert F. Kennedy, Governor George Wallace of Alabama, Deputy Attorney General Nicholas Katzenbach, and the students involved, Vivian Malone and James Hood. Since Wallace had promised to personally block the two black students from enrolling in the university, the Kennedy administration discusses how to respond without rousing the crowd, as had happened the year before in Mississippi, or making Wallace a martyr for the segregationist cause. They come up with a way in which they can quickly federalize the Alabama National Guard if the students are turned away so that Malone and Hood can return and enroll later the same day, rather than the next day, which it is hoped will show that the move is justified, but not let Wallace delay the court-mandated integration for more than a few hours.

The plan works. Wallace, after initially standing his ground, steps aside under orders from General Henry V. Graham and the students enter the building. That night, President Kennedy gives a speech about civil rights on national television. Later, a third black student, Dave McGlathery is shown enrolling in the University of Alabama without incident.

== Reception ==
Although opinions on Crisis were sharply divided after the October 1963 broadcast, it is now considered among the landmark films of cinéma vérité, or direct cinema. Peter von Bagh rated it ahead of Drew's earlier work Primary, considering it the most touching and intimate portrait of the Kennedy brothers on film. Fred Kaplan, in a review for The New York Times of the film's 2009 DVD release, wrote that "though we now know the story’s ending — the students were finally let in — the suspense is gripping." He dubbed it "the first movie that Barack Obama should watch in the White House screening room."

In 2011, this film was deemed "culturally, historically, or aesthetically significant" by the United States Library of Congress and selected for preservation in the National Film Registry. The Registry said that Crisis "has proven to be a uniquely revealing complement to written histories of the period, providing viewers the rare opportunity to witness historical events from an insider’s perspective." The Academy Film Archive preserved Crisis in 1999.

== See also ==
- List of American films of 1963
- Cultural depictions of John F. Kennedy
- Robert F. Kennedy in media
- Civil rights movement in popular culture
