= Pilottone =

Pilottone (or Pilotone) and the related neo-pilot tone are specialized synchronization signals used in analog audio recording systems. These signals, often associated with double-system recordings, were primarily developed for motion picture production to maintain synchronization between sound and film when recorded on separate media. Before the widespread adoption of timecode in the film industry, pilotone synchronization was the standard method used on nearly all 1/4-inch magnetic double-system sound recordings for motion pictures from the late 1950s through the late 1980s. Prior to the use of 1/4-inch audio tape, sound recordings were made on 35mm optical film and later on 16mm or 35mm magnetic film. The first 1/4-inch recorder capable of recording a sync track to regulate playback speed was developed by Rangertone, which introduced a precursor to the Pilotone system.

== History ==
According to Carsten Diercks, a camera operator and filmmaker at West-German Nordwestdeutscher Rundfunk (NWDR) during the 1950s, pilottone was invented at the NWDR studio in Hamburg-Lokstedt, West Germany by NWDR technical engineer Adalbert Lohmann and his assistant Udo Stepputat in the early 1950s for single-camera 16mm TV news gathering and documentaries. The first program featuring the use of pilottone was the documentary Musuri - Es geht aufwärts am Kongo ("Musuri: Upstream/progress at the Congo"), shot in early 1954 in Africa and first broadcast on ARD on March 31, 1954. The new technology required new editing suites, and Musuri camera operator Diercks turned to a small nearby six person workshop named Steenbeck. The success of the previously overlooked 16mm format for television program gathering—enabled by the pilotone system—helped transform Steenbeck into a multinational corporation.

Neo-pilottone was invented in 1957 by Stefan Kudelski with the Nagra III tape recorder.

The new technology of pilottone was brought to international attention by its use by Richard Leacock, former cameraman of filmmaker Robert Flaherty, in his documentary feature Primary (1960), documenting the competing Democratic presidential nominee candidates Hubert Humphrey and John F. Kennedy. Diercks himself helped the spread of pilottone in the USA when he was the only Western reporter allowed to shoot in Havana during the Bay of Pigs Invasion in April 1961. CBS secured the licensing rights to Diercks's material via Norddeutscher Rundfunk (NWDR had split in 1956 into NDR and WDR), and brought it on air on May 14, 1961, ten days prior to the German broadcast of the same material. At a time when North American TV program gathering was dominated by either Movietone (see also Movietone News) or magnetic pre-striping for live-sound recording, and the use of pilottone was still unheard of, according to Diercks, the US TV networks were impressed with the system demonstrated by the 60-minute documentary feature.

== Technology ==
Synchronization in audio and visual recording systems has historically been achieved through one of two primary methods. The initial approach involved utilizing a microphone cable to connect a motion picture camera to an audio recorder, such as those manufactured by Stellavox or Nagra. A camera equipped with a synchronous motor transmits a 60/50 Hz signal to the recorder, which is captured as a sine wave pilot tone. This method has since been supplanted by the incorporation of a crystal oscillator within the audio recorder, which generates the 60 Hz signal, in conjunction with a crystal-controlled camera motor. The audio recorder is equipped with two recording heads: a full-track mono head that records audio in the conventional manner and a neo-pilot head, which also functions for playback of the pilot tone signal.

This neo-pilot head is aligned at a 90-degree angle to the audio head and records the pilot tone down the center of the mono audio signal. The phase difference of 90 degrees causes the pilot tone signal, being a push-pull signal, to cancel itself out, rendering it inaudible during audio playback. This phenomenon is analogous to a single audio signal being split into two channels, where a phase inversion on one channel results in the cancellation of the signal when both tracks are played back simultaneously at equal levels. A notable limitation of this system is that, when a pilot tone tape is played on a stereo recorder, the 60 Hz signal may be audible unless the stereo channels are recombined into mono.

During playback, the pilot head functions as a push-pull playback head, facilitating the reproduction of the pilot tone. The playback mechanism compares the reproduced pilot signal to the line frequency (60/50 Hz), which governs the motor speed of the synchronous 16/35mm magnetic recorder and subsequently adjusts the playback speed accordingly. Modern 16/35mm recorders employ an internal quartz oscillator, while the 1/4-inch tape player references the playback pilot signal against its own highly accurate internal crystal oscillator.

Although standard audio tape recorders exhibit commendable regulation of tape speed, they lack the precision necessary to ensure that a playback machine will consistently match the recording speed over extended periods. In contrast, the pilottone system provides a reliable solution for maintaining synchronization.

== Obsolescence ==
The pilottone system was phased out in the early 1990s when SMPTE timecode became the sync reference standard. The advantage of timecode over pilottone synch is that it is not only a speed reference but also a positioning reference. The hour:minute:second: frame readout that the timecode provides allows the film transferred to tape digital, or video precise matching of picture and sound.

The only "problem" with timecode is that it is a machine-read system so pictures and sound must be transferred to an editing system (such as DaVinci Resolve or Adobe Premiere Pro) to be synched and edited. With the use of editing programs becoming the standard in film industry, this is not seen as a huge issue. However, for some movies, e.g. Quentin Tarantino, which are still shot on analog film, this can cause some trouble.

== See also ==
- Cinéma vérité
- Direct Cinema
- Pilot signal
