= Jerry Torre =

American sculptor

- Born: Gerard Joseph Torre; 1955 (age 70–71); Kensington, Brooklyn, New York
- Other name: “The Marble Faun”
- Citizenship: US
- Occupation: Sculptor
- Known for: Grey Gardens
- Partner: Ted O’Ryan Sheppard
- Relatives: Joe Torre

Jerry Torre (b. 1955) is an American sculptor. He is best known for his appearance in the 1975 independent documentary films Grey Gardens and The Beales of Grey Gardens by Albert and David Maysles. As a sculptor, his work has been shown in several galleries in New York City and written about in The New York Times, The Wall Street Journal, Vogue, Architectural Digest, Forbes, among other publications. He is affectionately known among cult-film followers as "The Marble Faun", a nickname that Edith Bouvier Beale gave him upon their first meeting. Torre worked as an assistant to Wayland Flowers, and through Aristotle Onassis obtained a job tending gardens for the royal family of Saudi Arabia. He was portrayed in the Tony Award-winning Broadway musical Grey Gardens in 2006. His life has been documented in the 2011 film The Marble Faun of Grey Gardens.

== Personal background ==
Torre was born to Italian-American parents in Kensington, Brooklyn, the son of a sanitation worker and a school custodian. He claims that Joe Torre is a distant cousin.

In 1974 Torre graduated from Sachem High School. He ran away from home when he was sixteen; mainly to escape a father he described as “very tough, even abusive”. He found his way to East Hampton, New York where his uncle was building a house. Torre said his uncle helped him in many ways: “… to construct his house, he used old cobblestones that had been dug up from Brooklyn streets that were being repaved. Cleaning them and learning how to use them to erect walls – all of that was part of my first encounter with stone.”

According to an interview, while working as a gardener and maintenance man for the Gerald Geddes estate in 1972, (Torre was set up in a room above the garage), he saw a woman in sunglasses and a headscarf walk along the narrow path that led to the entrance of a next door property. The woman was Jacqueline Kennedy Onassis, the former American First Lady and widow of President John F. Kennedy, and who was now married to Greek shipping magnate Aristotle Onassis. The nearby property and house belonged to Mrs. Edith Ewing Bouvier Beale and her daughter Edith Bouvier Beale, aunt and first cousin to Mrs. Onassis.

Torre approached the house one day and introduced himself to Edith “Little Edie” Beale and asked if she needed any work done. “Little Edie” introduced him to her mother “Big Edie” who lectured him about the benefits of a balanced diet and then proceeded to offer him potato salad and boiled chicken. Shortly thereafter he became their personal handyman, doing odd jobs around the house. It was during this time that filmmakers Albert and David Maysles filmed the documentary Grey Gardens.

After leaving East Hampton, Torre went to Maine to build a cabin. He then went to work as an assistant to Wayland Flowers. Later, through Aristotle Onassis, he acquired a job tending a two-and-a-half-acre palace garden in Saudi Arabia, Riyadh.

After returning to the States, Torre ran an art-moving company called AAA All-Boro Trucking in New York City and then drove a cab for 20 years. On the side, he carved in stone.

In 2005, a woman got into Torre’s taxi cab in New York City carrying a video camera and tripod. He asked her if she had ever seen the film Grey Gardens. When she replied that she had, Torre said: “Well, I’m the Marble Faun.” The woman told him, “Albert Maysles has been looking for you for years. You've got to call his studio.”

Not long after the encounter in the taxi, Torre learned not only that he had become a cult icon figure but that he was about to be portrayed onstage in a musical based on the film at Playwrights Horizons in New York City.

Shortly after making contact, Torre and Maysles (David had died in 1987) reconnected and conversed for hours, with the documentarian filming the entire time. Maysles recalled, "Seeing Jerry again brought me right back to the time when we were all in the same little bedroom together and he was eating corn cooked by Mrs. Beale."

In 2008, playwright David Lally premiered his play Little Edie & The Marble Faun at the Metropolitan Playhouse's Annual Author Fest; and in 2011, filmmakers Steve Pellizza and Jason Hay released the documentary The Marble Faun of Grey Gardens, which follows Torre’s life after Grey Gardens to his job in Saudi Arabia, his days when he worked as a cab driver, to the present day as a professional sculptor. Today he lives with his partner of many years, Ted O'Ryan Sheppard (He has worked for many fashion companies Kenneth Cole, Saks & Donna Karan). They both work on many art projects together.

Torre released his memoir entitled The Marble Faun of Grey Gardens: A Memoir of the Beales, the Maysles Brothers, and Jacqueline Kennedy with film historian and author Tony Maietta in February 2018. The book was nominated for a 2019 Lambda Literary Award for Outstanding Memoir, and Torre and Maietta participated in book and film events in Los Angeles, New York, Philadelphia, Palm Springs, and other cities around the United States. The book topped Amazon's list of best selling gay-themed books in its initial weeks of release.

== Grey Gardens ==
In the summer of 1974, while working for the J. Paul Getty estate in East Hampton, New York, Torre rode his bike a different way than usual one day and approached a house where the hedges in front were so overgrown that the only parts visible were the two peaks of the gabled roof. He decided to explore what he thought was abandoned property.

Looking into the foyer, he could see cobwebs strewn from the walls to the chandelier. It was like a "scene out of a book." A lady came right to the door, opened it and said: "Oh, the Marble Faun is here," a reference to a Nathaniel Hawthorne story about a Greek sculpture. Torre had no idea what she meant, but was enthralled. The lady was Edith Bouvier Beale, cousin to Jacqueline Kennedy Onassis and daughter of Edith Ewing Bouvier Beale, the aunt of Onassis. The house was the Bouvier mansion Grey Gardens and Torre became the Beales' handyman; doing odd jobs around the house.

That same summer, the Beales were filmed by brothers David and Albert Maysles as the subject of the 1975 documentary Grey Gardens. The film became a cult sensation, and 31 years later, a Tony Award winning Broadway musical. Torre was played by actor Matthew Cavenaugh. The other subjects included in the film were Jack Helmuth and Lois Wright.

Due to Torre’s particular known affection for Mrs. Beale, the songwriting team for the musical Grey Gardens (Scott Frankel and Michael Korie) wrote a song called "Jerry Likes My Corn" which tenderly describes the relationship they shared. Torre claimed that the Beales "showed [him] a life where [he] could be [himself], explore, take chances."

In 2009, HBO released the film Grey Gardens starring Drew Barrymore and Jessica Lange about the lives of “Big” and “Little” Edie. According to director Michael Sucsy, Torre is not depicted in the film (although at one point on the film's commentary track, Sucsy can be heard exclaiming of a non-speaking character, "That’s Jerry! That’s our Marble Faun").

Today, Torre travels the country, attending film festivals and productions of Grey Gardens and making special guest appearances as “The Marble Faun”.

Torre was interviewed for NBC Nightly News which aired a special report covering the sale of Grey Gardens with Anne Thompson on February 23, 2017.

== Sculptor ==
In 1964, Torre went to the New York World's Fair. While holding his mother’s hand in the Vatican Pavilion, he saw Michelangelo's Pietà and said he "had [his] calling that day." He recalled: "I was amazed something so tender could be carved from something so difficult."

According to gallery owner Jackie Klempay, while spending time in Saudi Arabia and Egypt, Torre had a horse named Confetti who became the subject of the art for his exhibited pieces. He began carving stone in his partner's apartment stairwell on 23rd Street in New York City in 1987.

Torre is presently a Queens-based artist, primarily working in stone and earthenware. Will Heinrich in The New York Times describes Jerry's work: "The Marble Faun’s sculpture, similarly, at once rough and ornate, leaves plenty of room for viewers to appreciate the stone’s own numinous warmth."

His debut exhibition was in 2014 at the Jackie Klempay Gallery in Bushwick, Brooklyn. He is currently represented by SITUATIONS in New York City. He has since exhibited artwork at SITUATIONS in New York City; Canada Gallery, New York City; the Andrew Edlin Gallery, New York City; Geary Contemporary, New York City; 2nd Floor Projects, San Francisco; Bureau of General Services/Queer Division, New York City; Center 548, New York City; among others. His work is held in the collection of the American Folk Art Museum, New York City.
