= LaLee's Kin: The Legacy of Cotton =

2001 documentary film by Dickson, Froemke, and Maysles

- poster of "LaLee's Kin: The Legacy of Cotton"
- Directed by: Deborah Dickson; Susan Froemke; Albert Maysles
- Produced by: Susan Froemke
- Music by: Gary Lucas
- Production company: Maysles Films Inc.
- Distributed by: HBO
- Release date: June 22, 2001 (New York City)
- Running time: 89 minutes
- Country: United States
- Language: English

LaLee's Kin: The Legacy of Cotton is a 2001 American documentary film directed by Deborah Dickson, Susan Froemke, and Albert Maysles. It was nominated for Best Documentary Feature at the 74th Academy Awards.

== Content ==
LaLee's Kin: The Legacy of Cotton has two storylines, both of which show the impoverished lives of residents in the American South. The documentary draws the connection—a vicious cycle—between poverty and the lack of educational opportunity for black people living in the Mississippi Delta, over 150 years after the abolition of slavery.

Laura Lee (LaLee) Wallace, a great-granddaughter of a slave, is an illiterate 62-year-old woman who has been living all her life in Tallahatchie County, one of the poorest in the United States. She has two surviving son, nine daughters, 38 grandchildren, and 15 great-grandchildren. Her daily life consists of many difficulties: LaLee has to raise many of her grandchildren; her son is continually put in prison; and most of her daughters have to leave Tallahatchie County searching for work. LaLee's life is heavily dependent on the cotton industry; she struggles to earn a living by cooking lunches for people working in local cotton factories.

Reggie Barnes is the superintendent of the West Tallahatchie school system, which is put on probation by the state due to poor standardized test results. The school has the hardship of trying to educate the children of illiterate parents. The state will take over the school if it is unable to improve the annual standardized test scores.

== Production and release ==
The documentary is noted for using direct cinema techniques, thus creating a "more intimate and confronting work."

The film was shown at the Seattle International Film Festival (May 24–June 17, 2001) and participated in the documentary competition at the Sundance Film Festival in Park City, Utah (January 18–28, 2001). LaLee's Kin: The Legacy of Cotton was released theatrically in New York City on June 22, 2001. The film was released on DVD in 2010.

== Reception ==
=== Critical reaction ===
LaLee's Kin: The Legacy of Cotton received highly positive reviews from the critics. The documentary received a score of 78 out of 100 at Metacritic based on 5 reviews. The New York Times's critic A. O. Scott praised the film as "an exemplary work of cinéma vérité that allows its subjects to speak for themselves." TV Guide rated the film 3 out of 4 stars. Meanwhile, Variety magazine considered the film "an especially humanistic entry in the Maysles canon."

=== Nominations and awards ===
LaLee's Kin: The Legacy of Cotton garnered a nomination for Best Documentary Feature at both the 74th Academy Awards and the 17th Independent Spirit Awards. Veteran documentarian Albert Maysles won the "Excellence in Cinematography Award" at the Sundance Film Festival.
