= Hope Ryden =

American film producer

Hope Elaine Ryden (August 1, 1929 – June 18, 2017) was an American documentary producer and wildlife activist. She contributed to various publications including National Geographic, Audubon, Smithsonian, Defenders and The New York Times. She specialized in photographing animals such as beavers and coyotes across North America.

== Career ==
Hope Ryden was born in St. Paul, Minnesota, on August 1, 1929, to E. E. Ryden, a Lutheran minister, and Agnes Johnson, an organist and pianist. She studied English at the University of Iowa. While there, she appeared in the educational film A Closed Book alongside Milburn Stone. She later worked for Pan American Airways as a flight attendant, including the company's first transatlantic jet engine powered flight in 1958; she repeated the journey in 1983 on the flight's 25th anniversary. She later recalled: "It was the pre-jet days, so layovers on international flights were long. I'd have four or five days at a time in Africa and Asia. My objective was to see the animals of those continents."

Ryden left Pan Am in 1961 and worked in freelance photography with documentary and cinéma vérité producer Robert Drew, being the only female member of the organization. She produced her first successful film, Mission to Malaya in 1963, documenting the services of the Peace Corps. Two years later, she produced a film about a mixed-race couple in Virginia, Richard and Mildred Loving, who opposed the state's interracial marriage laws. It was not released to the public until 2011, when it was included in the Emmy Award-winning documentary The Loving Story.

After leaving Drew Associates, Ryden worked for the American Broadcasting Company. In 1965, she was sent to Suriname to document the rescue of around 10,000 wild animals from the Upper Suriname River.

In 1968, she visited Lovell, Wyoming, documenting a wild horse roundup by the Bureau of Land Management in the Pryor Mountains. Ryden later wrote seven books covering wild horses, beginning with 1970's America's Last Wild Horses. A friend said that Ryden was "called on to testify in Washington so many times that she [knew] the senators by their first names." Her testimony helped pass the Wild and Free-Roaming Horses and Burros Act of 1971, and she participated in its defense when its constitutionality was unsuccessfully challenged.

Missing in Randolph, was produced, written, and directed by Ryden in 1970. It documents the reactions of the residents of a small town, Randolph, NY, to the death of a community member, William Hillard, in Vietnam.

In 1972, Ryden released God’s Dog: A Celebration of the North American Coyote, having camped in remote parts of Wyoming and Montana for two years to observe and photograph the species "in an effort to discover the truth behind the ignorance and misinformation that has plagued this much-maligned animal for over 200 years".

Alongside naturalist John Miller, whom she later married, she studied beavers in Harriman State Park, leading to the book Lily Pond: Four Years with a Family of Beavers (1989).

In her late career Ryden returned to documentary film making, producing Cinéma Vérité: Defining the Moment (2000) and A President to Remember (2008), about John F. Kennedy.

She died on June 18, 2017, in Hyannis, Massachusetts, of complications from hip surgery.

== Awards ==
Ryden earned several awards during her career. These include the Animal Humanitarian of the Year Award from the Animal Protection Institute, the Humane Excellence Award from the ASPCA, and the Joseph Wood Krutch Award from the Humane Society for making a "significant contribution toward the improvement of life and environment on the planet".
