= Valley Curtain =

Environmental artwork

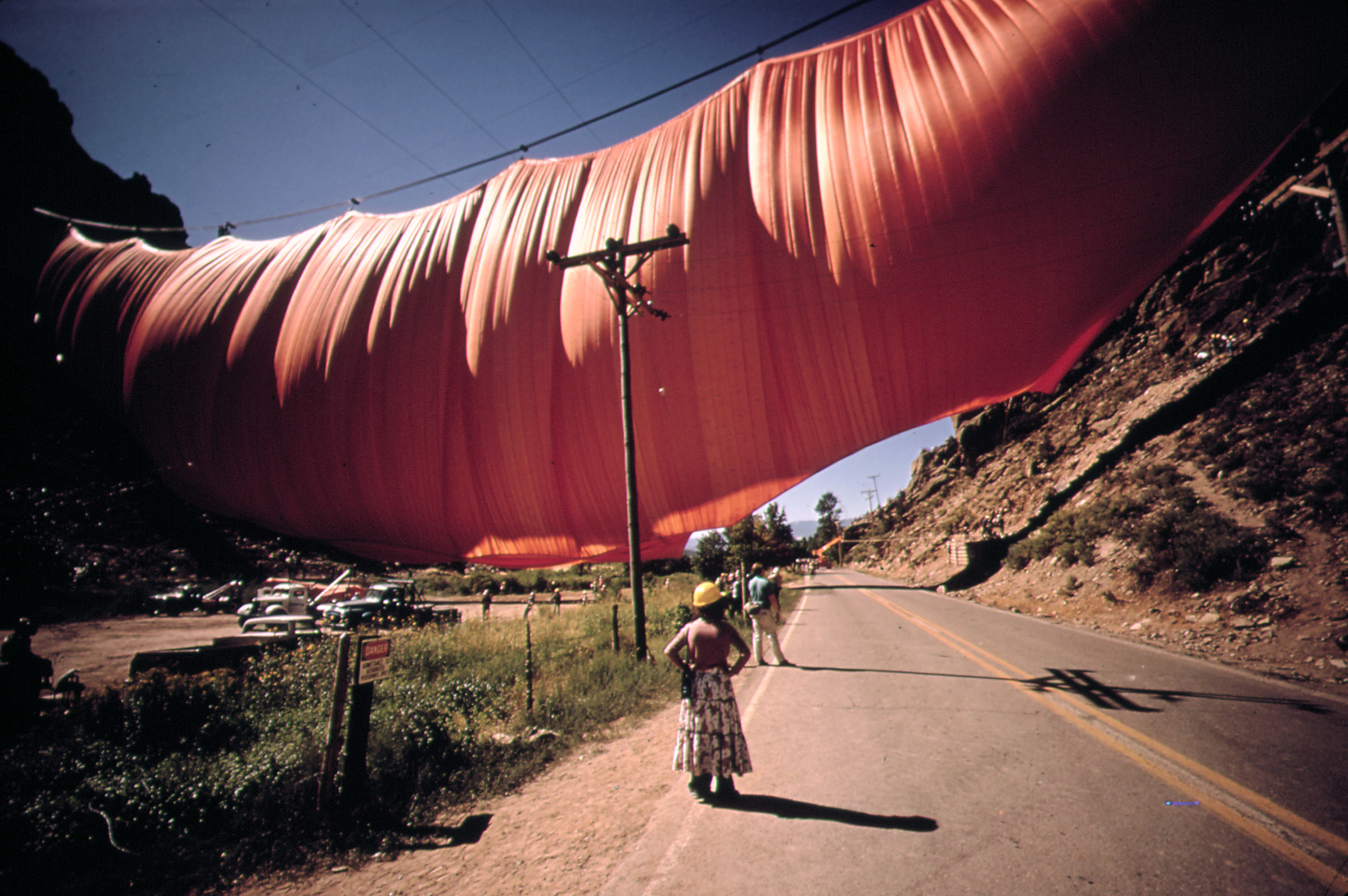
Valley Curtain, 1972

Valley Curtain was a 1972 environmental artwork in which artists Christo and Jeanne-Claude raised an orange curtain of fabric across a mountainous span of Colorado State Highway 325. Preparations began within a year of their Australian Wrapped Coast. The artists formed a corporation to benefit from tax and other liabilities, a form they used for later projects. Following a failed attempt to mount the curtain in late 1971, a new engineer and builder-contractor raised the fabric in August 1972. The work only stood for 28 hours before the wind again destroyed the fabric. This work, their most expensive to date and first to involve construction workers, was captured in a documentary by David and Albert Maysles. Christo's Valley Curtain was nominated for Best Documentary Short in the 1974 Academy Awards.

== Bibliography ==
- Baal-Teshuva, Jacob (2001). Christo and Jeanne-Claude. Taschen. ISBN 978-3-8228-5996-4.
- Chernow, Burt (2002). Christo and Jeanne-Claude: A Biography. Macmillan. ISBN 978-0-312-28074-1.
- Daley, Ann Scarlett; Paglia, Michael (2007). "Valley Curtain". Landscapes of Colorado: Mountains and Plains. Fresco Fine Art Publications. ISBN 978-0-9679034-6-0.
- Fineberg, Jonathan David (2004). "Valley Curtain". Christo and Jeanne-Claude: On the Way to The Gates, Central Park, New York City. Yale University Press. pp. 31–33. ISBN 978-0-300-10405-9.
