= The Love We Make =

- Directed by: Albert Maysles, Bradley Kaplan
- Produced by: Laura Coxson; Susan Froemke; Bradley Kaplan; Ian Markiewicz; Katie Shoran
- Starring: Paul McCartney
- Cinematography: Albert Maysles
- Edited by: Ian Markiewicz
- Production company: Maysles Films / MPL Communications
- Distributed by: Eagle Vision
- Release date: September 9, 2011 (Toronto International Film Festival)
- Running time: 91 minutes
- Country: United States

The Love We Make is a cinéma vérité documentary film by Albert Maysles. The film chronicles Paul McCartney's experiences in New York City after the September 11 attacks of 2001, following him as he prepared The Concert for New York City October 2001 benefit event. McCartney was on an airplane taxiing at JFK International Airport, about to depart for the United Kingdom, when the attacks occurred, and he wanted to do something to uplift and benefit the first responders in New York, so he arranged this concert. The film chronicles McCartney's planning and backstage experiences with the other participants in the concert.

The film premiered at the Toronto International Film Festival on September 9, 2011 along with a theatrical release on that day in Japan.

The film had its television premiere on Showtime on September 10, 2011 – the eve of the 10th anniversary of the attacks.

The home video was released by Eagle Rock Entertainment on December 6, 2011 on DVD and Blu-ray.

The film's title comes from a line in The Beatles' song "The End".
