= The Love We Make (disambiguation) =

The Love We Make is a 2011 film.

The Love We Make may also refer to:

- "The Love We Make", a song by Girl Overboard
- "The Love We Make", a song by Prince from Emancipation (1996)
- "The Love We Make", a song by Rodney Atkins from Honesty (2003)
