= 1960 United States presidential election in Wisconsin =

- November 8, 1960

Nominee	Richard Nixon	John F. Kennedy
Party	Republican	Democratic
Home state	California	Massachusetts
Running mate	Henry Cabot Lodge Jr.	Lyndon B. Johnson
Electoral vote	12	0
Popular vote	895,175	830,805
Percentage	51.77%	48.05%
County results
Nixon
50–60%
60–70%
70–80%
Kennedy
50–60%
60–70%
President before election
Dwight D. Eisenhower
Republican
Elected President
John F. Kennedy
Democratic

The 1960 United States presidential election in Wisconsin was held on November 8, 1960, as part of the 1960 United States presidential election. State voters chose 12 electors to the Electoral College, who voted for president and vice president.

As of the 2024 presidential election, this was the last time a Democrat won the presidency without winning Wisconsin, although the party won the popular vote without the state in 2016. Wisconsin would not back the overall losing candidate in a presidential election again until 1988.

== Background ==
Politics in Wisconsin since the Populist movement had been dominated by the Republican Party. The Democratic Party became uncompetitive away from the Lake Michigan coast as the upper classes, along with the majority of workers who followed them, fled from William Jennings Bryan’s agrarian and free silver sympathies. Although the state did develop a strong Socialist Party to provide opposition to the GOP, Wisconsin developed the direct Republican primary in 1903 and this ultimately created competition between the “League” under Robert M. La Follette, and the conservative “Regular” faction. This ultimately would develop into the Wisconsin Progressive Party in the late 1930s, which was opposed to the conservative German Democrats and to the national Republican Party, and allied with Franklin D. Roosevelt at the federal level.

During the two wartime elections, the formerly Democratic German counties in the east of the state – which had been powerfully opposed to the Civil War because they saw it as a “Yankee” war and opposed the military draft instituted during it – viewed Communism as a much greater threat to America than Nazism and consequently opposed President Roosevelt's war effort. Consequently, these historically Democratic counties became virtually the most Republican in the entire state, and became a major support base for populist conservative Senator Joe McCarthy, who became notorious for his investigations into Communists inside the American government. The state's populace's opposition to Communism and the Korean War turned Wisconsin strongly to Republican nominee Dwight D. Eisenhower in the 1952 and 1956 presidential elections.

The 1958 midterm elections, however, saw a major change in Wisconsin politics, as Gaylord A. Nelson became only the state's second Democratic Governor since 1895, and the state also elected Democrats to the position of treasurer and Senator, besides that party gaining a majority in the State Assembly for only the second time since the middle 1890s. In the spring, despite anti-Catholic suspicion, polls indicated that Kennedy would defeat Nixon in Wisconsin.

During the fall campaign, polls at the end of September showed that Nixon had gained, due to the religion issue and Eisenhower's success in achieving a level of peace with the Soviet Union. The state's Republican Party stressed achievements in peacemaking, whilst Kennedy's October visit to the state would stress failures in the farm sector during Eisenhower's administration. In the November election, the state fluctuated before Nixon ultimately carried Wisconsin by a relatively comfortable 3.72 point margin.

== Primary election ==
In the 1960 Democratic primaries, Wisconsin voted for Massachusetts Senator John F. Kennedy, due to strong support from Catholics who had recently backed Republican candidates, whilst Vice President Nixon was uncontested in the Republican primary. A behind-the-scenes look at the Democratic primary campaign was featured in the Robert Drew-directed documentary Primary.

=== Results ===
Democratic primary results
Party	Candidate	Votes	%
Democratic	John F. Kennedy	476,024	56.48%
Democratic	Hubert H. Humphrey	366,753	43.52%
Total votes		842,777	100.00%

Republican primary results
Party	Candidate	Votes	%
Republican	Richard M. Nixon	339,383	100.00%
Total votes		339,383	100.00%

== General election ==
=== Results ===
1960 United States presidential election in Wisconsin
Party	Candidate	Votes	Percentage	Electoral votes
Republican	Richard Nixon	895,175	51.77%	12
Democratic	John F. Kennedy	830,805	48.05%	0
Socialist Workers (Note: "Independent Socialist Workers")	Farrell Dobbs	1,792	0.10%	0
Socialist Labor (Note: "Independent Socialist Labor")	Eric Hass	1,310	0.08%	0
Totals		1,729,082	100.00%	12

=== Results by county ===
County	Richard Nixon Republican		John F. Kennedy Democratic		Other candidates Various parties		Margin		Total votes cast
County	#	%	#	%	#	%	#	%	Total votes cast
Adams	2,109	57.40%	1,551	42.22%	14	0.38%	558	15.18%	3,674
Ashland	3,470	42.70%	4,644	57.14%	13	0.16%	-1,174	-14.44%	8,127
Barron	8,640	57.05%	6,464	42.68%	41	0.27%	2,176	14.37%	15,145
Bayfield	2,841	46.88%	3,196	52.74%	23	0.38%	-355	-5.86%	6,060
Brown	26,329	49.72%	26,577	50.19%	46	0.09%	-248	-0.47%	52,952
Buffalo	3,464	55.37%	2,790	44.60%	2	0.03%	674	10.77%	6,256
Burnett	2,483	54.03%	2,095	45.58%	18	0.39%	388	8.45%	4,596
Calumet	5,166	54.46%	4,312	45.46%	8	0.08%	854	9.00%	9,486
Chippewa	8,690	46.95%	9,793	52.90%	28	0.15%	-1,103	-5.95%	18,511
Clark	7,368	55.22%	5,934	44.47%	41	0.31%	1,434	10.75%	13,343
Columbia	10,282	60.94%	6,576	38.97%	15	0.09%	3,706	21.97%	16,873
Crawford	3,719	52.60%	3,342	47.26%	10	0.14%	377	5.34%	7,071
Dane	43,245	47.78%	47,045	51.98%	212	0.23%	-3,800	-4.20%	90,502
Dodge	17,152	62.84%	10,113	37.05%	30	0.11%	7,039	25.79%	27,295
Door	5,790	61.50%	3,610	38.35%	14	0.15%	2,180	23.15%	9,414
Douglas	8,307	39.06%	12,910	60.70%	53	0.25%	-4,603	-21.64%	21,270
Dunn	6,723	59.82%	4,487	39.92%	29	0.26%	2,236	19.90%	11,239
Eau Claire	14,427	56.13%	11,240	43.73%	37	0.14%	3,187	12.40%	25,704
Florence	928	51.81%	858	47.91%	5	0.28%	70	3.90%	1,791
Fond du Lac	19,498	59.65%	13,132	40.17%	58	0.18%	6,366	19.48%	32,688
Forest	1,653	47.04%	1,851	52.68%	10	0.28%	-198	-5.64%	3,514
Grant	11,564	60.05%	7,678	39.87%	16	0.08%	3,886	20.18%	19,258
Green	7,939	67.79%	3,766	32.16%	6	0.05%	4,173	35.63%	11,711
Green Lake	5,110	64.74%	2,776	35.17%	7	0.09%	2,334	29.57%	7,893
Iowa	5,143	59.16%	3,547	40.80%	4	0.05%	1,596	18.36%	8,694
Iron	1,290	30.94%	2,873	68.90%	7	0.17%	-1,583	-37.96%	4,170
Jackson	3,950	57.98%	2,849	41.82%	14	0.21%	1,101	16.16%	6,813
Jefferson	14,133	61.64%	8,757	38.19%	39	0.17%	5,376	23.45%	22,929
Juneau	4,997	60.60%	3,238	39.27%	11	0.13%	1,759	21.33%	8,246
Kenosha	19,969	46.43%	22,956	53.37%	86	0.20%	-2,987	-6.94%	43,011
Kewaunee	3,950	48.09%	4,256	51.82%	7	0.09%	-306	-3.73%	8,213
La Crosse	18,319	56.08%	14,310	43.81%	36	0.11%	4,009	12.27%	32,665
Lafayette	4,715	56.60%	3,607	43.30%	8	0.10%	1,108	13.30%	8,330
Langlade	4,614	53.31%	4,025	46.50%	16	0.18%	589	6.81%	8,655
Lincoln	6,147	60.93%	3,909	38.75%	33	0.33%	2,238	22.18%	10,089
Manitowoc	14,622	45.58%	17,423	54.31%	35	0.11%	-2,801	-8.73%	32,080
Marathon	21,880	54.67%	18,145	45.33%	0	0.00%	3,735	9.34%	40,025
Marinette	8,205	52.50%	7,408	47.40%	17	0.11%	797	5.10%	15,630
Marquette	2,947	70.12%	1,249	29.72%	7	0.17%	1,698	40.40%	4,203
Milwaukee	187,067	41.96%	257,707	57.81%	1,033	0.23%	-70,640	-15.85%	445,807
Monroe	7,410	58.87%	5,161	41.00%	16	0.13%	2,249	17.87%	12,587
Oconto	6,223	55.15%	5,045	44.71%	15	0.13%	1,178	10.44%	11,283
Oneida	5,676	53.22%	4,974	46.63%	16	0.15%	702	6.59%	10,666
Outagamie	24,146	58.15%	17,287	41.63%	89	0.21%	6,859	16.52%	41,522
Ozaukee	10,401	58.91%	7,228	40.94%	28	0.16%	3,173	17.97%	17,657
Pepin	1,612	47.69%	1,763	52.16%	5	0.15%	-151	-4.47%	3,380
Pierce	5,632	56.56%	4,317	43.35%	9	0.09%	1,315	13.21%	9,958
Polk	6,387	55.23%	5,148	44.51%	30	0.26%	1,239	10.72%	11,565
Portage	6,436	37.92%	10,516	61.96%	20	0.12%	-4,080	-24.04%	16,972
Price	3,555	51.10%	3,382	48.61%	20	0.29%	173	2.49%	6,957
Racine	29,562	49.03%	30,596	50.74%	136	0.23%	-1,034	-1.71%	60,294
Richland	5,253	63.84%	2,965	36.03%	11	0.13%	2,288	27.81%	8,229
Rock	29,675	60.63%	19,194	39.22%	76	0.16%	10,481	21.41%	48,945
Rusk	3,094	45.48%	3,692	54.27%	17	0.25%	-598	-8.79%	6,803
Sauk	10,403	61.68%	6,441	38.19%	23	0.14%	3,962	23.49%	16,867
Sawyer	2,699	53.59%	2,325	46.17%	12	0.24%	374	7.42%	5,036
Shawano	9,734	67.18%	4,734	32.67%	21	0.14%	5,000	34.51%	14,489
Sheboygan	21,676	53.89%	18,425	45.81%	120	0.30%	3,251	8.08%	40,221
St. Croix	7,113	52.77%	6,341	47.05%	24	0.18%	772	5.72%	13,478
Taylor	3,447	47.63%	3,768	52.07%	22	0.30%	-321	-4.44%	7,237
Trempealeau	5,539	51.38%	5,223	48.45%	19	0.18%	316	2.93%	10,781
Vernon	6,909	58.75%	4,836	41.12%	15	0.13%	2,073	17.63%	11,760
Vilas	3,508	64.25%	1,942	35.57%	10	0.18%	1,566	28.68%	5,460
Walworth	16,395	67.19%	7,986	32.73%	20	0.08%	8,409	34.46%	24,401
Washburn	2,848	54.13%	2,398	45.58%	15	0.29%	450	8.55%	5,261
Washington	11,452	57.29%	8,523	42.63%	16	0.08%	2,929	14.66%	19,991
Waukesha	39,380	57.56%	28,963	42.33%	76	0.11%	10,417	15.23%	68,419
Waupaca	12,247	72.61%	4,606	27.31%	14	0.08%	7,641	45.30%	16,867
Waushara	4,906	72.16%	1,888	27.77%	5	0.07%	3,018	44.39%	6,799
Winnebago	28,598	61.72%	17,656	38.11%	80	0.17%	10,942	23.61%	46,334
Wood	14,414	57.82%	10,483	42.05%	33	0.13%	3,931	15.77%	24,930
Totals	895,175	51.77%	830,805	48.05%	3,102	0.18%	64,370	3.72%	1,729,082

==== Counties that flipped from Republican to Democratic ====
- Ashland
- Bayfield
- Brown
- Chippewa
- Dane
- Forest
- Kenosha
- Kewaunee
- Manitowoc
- Milwaukee
- Pepin
- Portage
- Racine
- Rusk
- Taylor

=== Electors ===
These were the names of the electors on each ticket.

Richard M. Nixon & Henry Cabot Lodge Jr. Republican Party	John F. Kennedy & Lyndon B. Johnson Democratic Party	Farrell Dobbs & Myra Tanner Weiss Socialist Workers Party	Eric Hass & Stephen Emery Socialist Labor Party
Philip G. Kuehn; Warren P. Knowles; William Trinkle; Frank Panzer; George Thompson; Dena Smith; Holley Cooley; Samuel N. Pickard; Emily Baldwin; Harvey Higley; John Lindner Jr.; Paul Alfonsi	Gaylord A. Nelson; William Proxmire; George Molinaro; Robert W. Kastermeier; Norman M. Clapp; Clement J. Zablocki; Walter Hale; Henry A. Hillemann; Robert W. Dean; Owen Monfils; Arthur Henning; Joseph Szumowski	James E. Boulton; Charles F. Dynzoff; Myrtle C. Kastner; Florence E. Kirkland; Fred Kneevers; Elmer Leverenz; Wayne Leverenz; Ted J. Odell; Shirley Plaster; Albert Stergar; Betsy Stergar; Charles O. Taplin	Pauline Adolphe; Frank Brlas; Joseph Brlas; Steve Fischer Sr.; Marko Golubich; Matthew Karlovich; Samuel Munek; Henry A. Ochsner; William Schlingman; Ferdinand Schnarsky; Walter Semrau; Arthur Wepfer

== See also ==
- United States presidential elections in Wisconsin
