= Lois Wright =

American artist, author, palmist (1928–2023)

Lois Erdmann Wright
- Born: July 9, 1928; New York City, New York, U.S.
- Died: October 13, 2023 (aged 95); Southampton, New York, U.S.
- Resting place: Cedar Lawn Cemetery, East Hampton, New York
- Occupations: Artist, author, palmistry, television host
- Known for: Grey Gardens
- Relatives: William Wright; Dr. John F. Erdmann
- Website: loiswright.net

Lois Erdmann Wright (July 9, 1928 – October 13, 2023) was an American artist, author, and television personality. She was best known for her appearance in the 1975 independent documentary film Grey Gardens by Albert and David Maysles. She was the author of the memoir My Life at Grey Gardens: 13 Months and Beyond. She hosted The Lois Wright Show for LTV Public Access in East Hampton for over 30 years; broadcasting her final show on December 19, 2018. As an artist, she exhibited at Guild Hall in East Hampton and at the National Arts Club in New York. Her art focused mainly on Edith Bouvier Beale and Edith Ewing Bouvier Beale of Grey Gardens.

== Personal background ==
Wright was the niece of the late Dr. John F. Erdmann, who was Professor of Surgery and Director of Surgery at the New York Post-Graduate Medical College and Hospital from 1908 until 1934. Dr. Erdmann lived at Coxwould in East Hampton and is best remembered for performing a "secret surgery" on President Grover Cleveland aboard the Steam Ship Oneida in 1893.

Wright was also the sister of the late William Wright. In the fall of 1950, William Wright conducted the first and only audio recorded interview of Jackson Pollock at Pollock's home on Springs Fireplace Road in East Hampton, New York. William Wright was portrayed by actor David Cale in the film biopic Pollock starring Ed Harris.

Lois Wright died in Southampton, New York, on October 13, 2023, at the age of 95.

== Career ==
Wright was called "the Palmist of the Hamptons," and read palms and tarot cards throughout the area, including East Hampton's Sea Spray on the Dunes, Montauk's Gurney's Inn, Southampton's The Old Post House, and in Grey Gardens. She read several celebrity palms, including that of Bette Davis, who once said that Wright "read her palm better than anyone from Hollywood to East Hampton".

Wright hosted a television show for East Hampton LTV cable access beginning in 1984. She started as a psychic, reading palms, and talking about her days at Grey Gardens. Over time, the setting changed to various locations, such as The Old West, where Wright interviewed celebrities, including artists, writers, and politicians, among others. The Lois Wright Show was the longest-running cable access show on LTV until its end in 2018.

As an artist, Wright's work was shown at the Sag Harbor Gallery, Guild Hall in East Hampton, and the National Arts Club in New York City. Her art mainly focuses on the subjects of Grey Gardens – Edith Bouvier Beale and Edith Ewing Bouvier Beale – and seascapes off the coast of Montauk.

== Grey Gardens ==
Wright was featured in the 1975 documentary film Grey Gardens by Albert and David Maysles and the follow-up film The Beales of Grey Gardens. In the first film, Wright was a guest during a birthday celebration for "Big Edie", Edith Ewing Bouvier Beale. In The Beales of Grey Gardens, Wright is shown to be a close friend of the Beales, and is spotlighted for her talents as a palmist.

According to her book, My Life at Grey Gardens: 13 Months and Beyond, Wright lived with the Beales at Grey Gardens, from May 1975 until June 1976. She remained close to the Beales until Big Edie's death on February 5, 1977 and Little Edie's death on January 9, 2002.

In a New York Times article, Sally Quinn recalls Wright appearing unexpectedly at Grey Gardens and informing her that she was bringing a message from Big Edie. Wright said that Big Edie wanted Quinn to have the house, that Quinn was meant to have it, that Big Edie was watching over her and that everything would go absolutely perfectly.

Wright is the subject of the 2010 children's book Bijoux Goes to Grey Gardens by J.C. Burdine. The story depicts Wright accompanying a small French Bulldog on an adventure through an estate in East Hampton.

In the 2017 film That Summer directed by Göran Hugo Olsson, Wright is telephoned by the Beales and enticed to come over for the filming of the documentary, but she declines. An entire scene is devoted to the conversation between the Beales and Wright.

== Published works ==
- Wright, Lois (2007). My Life at Grey Gardens: 13 Months and Beyond. Wright. ISBN 978-0-9777462-1-7.
- Hagan, Tania, co-authored by Lois Wright (2019). The Ghost of Grey Gardens: Lois Wright's Life Story. Independently Published. ISBN 978-1081689612.

== Filmography ==
Year	Title	Role	Notes
1975	Grey Gardens	Herself	Party guest; uncredited
2006	The Beales of Grey Gardens	Herself	Friend; uncredited
2017	That Summer	Herself	Uncredited
