= Iris Apfel =

American designer (1921–2024)

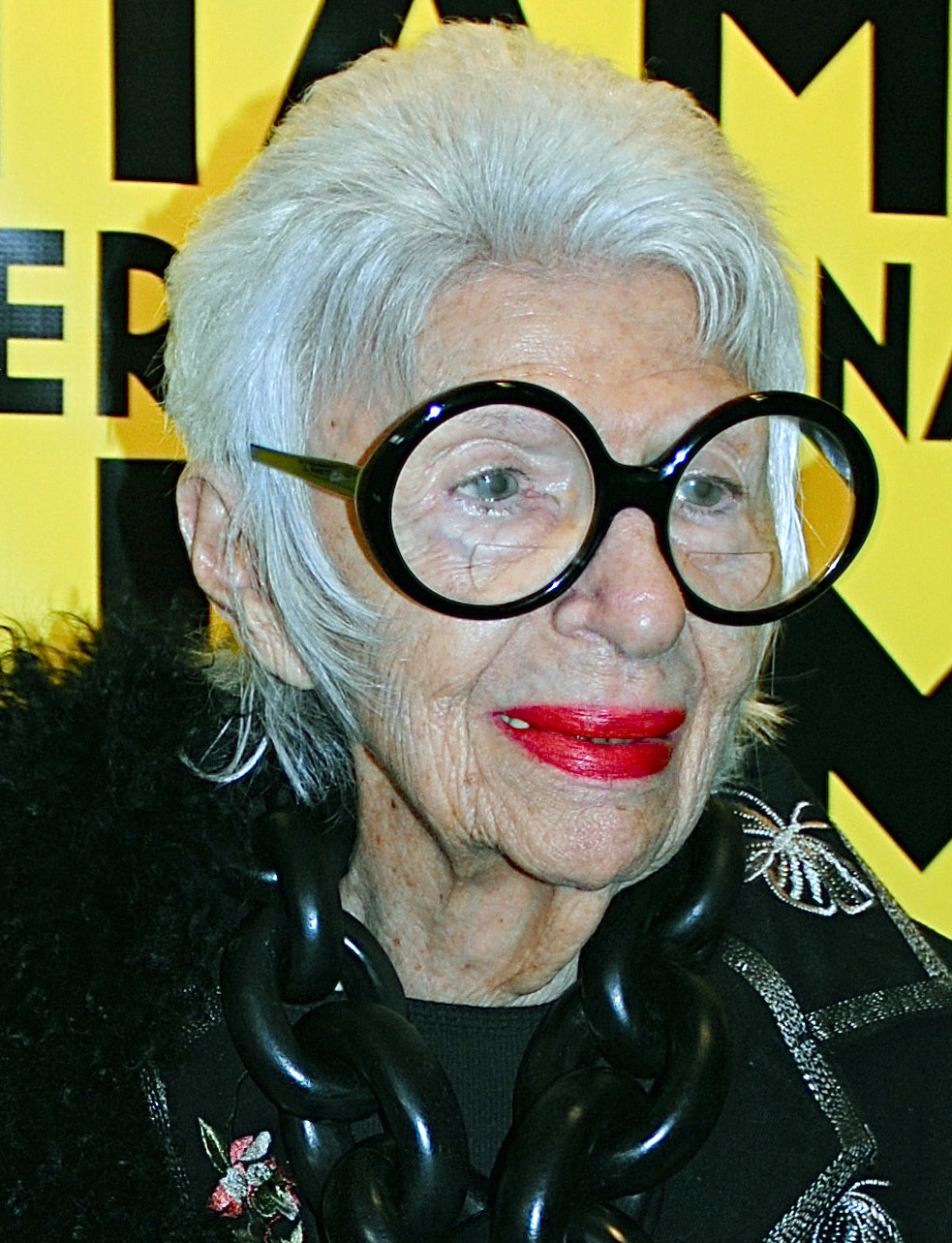
- Apfel in 2015
- Born: Iris Barrel; August 29, 1921; Queens, New York, U.S.
- Died: March 1, 2024 (aged 102); Palm Beach, Florida, U.S.
- Resting place: Beth David Cemetery, Elmont, New York
- Education: New York University; University of Wisconsin
- Occupations: Businesswoman; interior designer; fashion designer; model
- Years active: 1950–2024
- Spouse: Carl Apfel (m. 1948; died 2015)

Iris Apfel (/ˈæpfɛl/ AP-fəl; née Barrel; August 29, 1921 – March 1, 2024) was an American businesswoman, interior designer, and fashion designer, known for her flamboyant style, outspoken personality and oversized eyeglasses. In business with her husband, Carl, from 1950 to 1992, Apfel had a career in textiles, including a contract with the White House that spanned nine presidencies. In retirement, she drew acclaim for a 2005 show at the Costume Institute at The Metropolitan Museum of Art featuring her collection of costume jewelry and styled with clothes on mannequins as she would wear them. She became a fashion icon, was the focus of the 2014 Albert Maysles documentary Iris, then signed to IMG in 2019 as a model at age 97.

== Early life ==
Born Iris Barrel in to a Jewish family in Astoria, Queens, New York City, on August 29, 1921, Apfel was the only child of Samuel Barrel (1897–1967), whose family owned a glass and mirror business, and his Russian-born wife, Sadye "Syd" Barrel (née Asofsky, 1898–1998), who owned a fashion boutique. Her grandfather Morris Barrel (born Mayer Baril) emigrated from Kamianka-Buzka, Galicia (now Ukraine).

Although raised on a farm by her parents and grandparents, she often rode the subway into the city to explore Manhattan, where she fell in love with Greenwich Village. While still a child, she shopped its antique shops, starting her extraordinary collection of jewellery from around the world. During the Depression, her whole family could sew, drape, glue, and paint, and had a flair for design and style on the smallest of budgets.

Apfel studied art history at New York University and attended art school at the University of Wisconsin.

== Career ==
As a young woman, Apfel worked as a copywriter for Women's Wear Daily, earning $15 a week, and for interior designer Elinor Johnson, decorating apartments for resale and honing her talent for sourcing rare items. She was also an assistant to illustrator Robert Goodman.

On February 22, 1948, she married Carl Apfel. Two years later, in 1950, they launched the textile firm Old World Weavers and ran it until they retired in 1992. The Apfels specialised in the reproduction of fabrics from the 17th, 18th, and 19th centuries, and traveled to Europe twice a year in search of textiles they could not source in the United States. The business's New York showroom was located at 115 East 57th Street in Manhattan. Over her career, Iris Apfel took part in a variety of design restoration projects, including work at the White House for nine presidents: Harry S. Truman, Dwight D. Eisenhower, John F. Kennedy, Lyndon B. Johnson, Richard Nixon, Gerald Ford, Jimmy Carter, Ronald Reagan, and Bill Clinton. She found the White House contract to be among the easiest of Old World Weavers' clients, as they generally wanted only to replicate what had previously been in place. The one exception, Apfel said, was Jacqueline Kennedy. Apfel recalled: "She employed a very famous Parisian designer to gussy up the house and make it a real Frenchie, and the design community went bananas. After that we had to throw it all out and start again. But I did like Mrs. Nixon. She was lovely."

Through their business, the couple began travelling all over the world where Apfel also bought pieces of non-Western, artisanal clothes. She wore these clothes to clients' high-society parties.

In 2011, Iris Apfel became a visiting professor at the University of Texas at Austin in its Division of Textiles and Apparel.

In 2016, she performed in a television commercial for the French car DS 3, and was the face of Australian brand Blue Illusion. In March 2016, Apfel announced a collaboration with technology startup WiseWear on an upcoming line of smart jewelry. HarperCollins published her biography Iris Apfel: Accidental Icon in 2018.

In 2019, at the age of 97, she signed a modelling contract with global agency IMG. Seeing that she was frequently sought out for appearances, Tommy Hilfiger encouraged her to sign with formal representation.

== Personal life ==
The Apfels did not have children, partly because of the frequent travel their work necessitated; she did not want her children to be raised by a nanny.

Apfel and her husband Carl shared a favorite fragrance: Yatagan by Caron.

Married 67 years, Carl died on August 1, 2015, aged 100. Apfel celebrated her 100th birthday on August 29, 2021.

=== Death ===
Apfel died at her home in Palm Beach, Florida, on March 1, 2024, at the age of 102. She was interred at Beth David Cemetery.

== Legacy ==
=== Museum retrospectives ===
On September 13, 2005, the Costume Institute at the Metropolitan Museum of Art in New York City premiered the exhibition Rara Avis [Rare Bird]: Selections from the Iris Barrel Apfel Collection, showcasing her style. It was the museum's first time mounting an exhibit about clothing and accessories focused on a living person who was not a designer. The success of the exhibition, curated by Stéphane Houy-Towner, prompted an initial travelling version of the exhibit at the Norton Museum of Art in West Palm Beach, Florida, the Nassau County Museum of Art in Roslyn Harbor, New York, and later at the Peabody Essex Museum in Salem, Massachusetts.

The Museum of Lifestyle & Fashion History in Boynton Beach, Florida, is designing a building that will house a dedicated gallery of Apfel's clothes, accessories, and furnishings.

=== Documentaries ===
Apfel was the focus of the Albert Maysles documentary Iris, which premiered at the New York Film Festival in October 2014, and was subsequently acquired by Magnolia Pictures for US theatrical distribution in 2015. She was interviewed in Advanced Style Film: Featurette, released in September 2014.

Apfel was also featured in the 2017 documentary If You're Not in the Obit, Eat Breakfast.

=== Film ===
It is believed that Iris Apfel was one of the inspirations behind the creation of the composite character Edna Mode who appears in the animated film The Incredibles and its sequel Incredibles 2; the other inspirations were costume designer Edith Head, editor-in-chief of Vogue magazine Anna Wintour, and actress Linda Hunt.

=== Barbie doll ===
In 2018, Mattel created a Barbie doll in Apfel's image, making her the oldest person to ever have a Barbie made in her image and the recipient of the highest honor the Barbie brand bestows. The Barbie, released in conjunction with Apfel's book, was not for sale, but Mattel also made two "Styled by Iris Apfel" Barbie dolls that were commercially available.

=== Awards and honors ===
In 2013, she was listed as one of the fifty "Best-Dressed over 50" by The Guardian.

Apfel was awarded the Women Together Special Award of the Year at the 12th Annual Women Together Gala held at the United Nations General Assembly Hall in New York City, on June 7, 2016.

Apfel was honored as The New Jewish Home's Eight over Eighty Gala 2017 honoree.
