= Wagner's Dream =

2012 documentary film

- Directed by: Susan Froemke
- Produced by: Susan Froemke; Douglas Graves
- Starring: Robert Lepage; Peter Gelb; Deborah Voigt
- Edited by: Bob Eisenhardt
- Release date: 2012
- Running time: 112 minutes
- Country: United States
- Language: English

Wagner's Dream is a documentary film directed by Susan Froemke. It premiered at the Tribeca Film Festival on April 25, 2012, and was shown in high definition in theaters across the United States and Canada on May 7, 2012. The subject of the film is the staging of a new production of Richard Wagner's four-opera cycle Der Ring des Nibelungen at the Metropolitan Opera beginning in 2010.

== Description ==
Froemke, who has previously filmed at the opera house, claims that she was given no limits by the opera company in filming the documentary. The documentary captures the challenges of creating the new production, including a complex 90,000 pounds (41,000 kg) set designed by Carl Fillion of Ex Machina (Robert Lepage's production company). The opera house had expected the set to weigh only 50,000 pounds (23,000 kg), so it's only when the set was finally delivered that need to reinforce the floor of the stage's left wing (by adding beams under it) became known. Among the mishaps covered in the documentary are the failure of the set to work properly at the premiere of the first Ring opera, Das Rheingold, and Deborah Voigt in the role of Brünnhilde falling and sliding down the set upon her entrance at the premiere of Die Walküre. The documentary covers other challenges faced, including the Metropolitan Opera's music director being forced to step down as conductor before the last two productions premiered and the need for tenor Jay Hunter Morris to step into the title role of Siegfried just three days before its premiere.

The film avoids making Lepage or Metropolitan Opera general manager Peter Gelb scapegoats for the challenges. James R. Oestreich of The New York Times claims that "the tone is basically adulatory, apart from a few skeptical notes sounded by ticket buyers and audience members", and notes that Gelb and Lepage "cut heroic figures in an epic adventure." David Patrick Stearns of The Philadelphia Inquirer was "charmed" by Voigt in the film.

== Cast ==
The cast of Wagner's Dream includes:

- Robert Lepage
- Peter Gelb
- Deborah Voigt
- Jay Hunter Morris
- James Levine
- Fabio Luisi
- Lisette Oropesa

== Soundtrack ==
The soundtrack of Wagner's Dream incorporates Wagner's music. Oestreich particularly praises the use of the music from the descent to Nibelheim from the end of scene 2 of Das Rheingold to accompany the production's move from Quebec to New York.

== Critical reception ==
David Patrick Stearns of The Philadelphia Inquirer stated that "the film is destined to be one of the classic documentaries about opera." James R. Oestreich of The New York Times felt it was "a bit long" but "beautifully made". Ronnie Scheib of Variety called it "a highly entertaining outing for operaphiles and operaphobes alike". John Terauds of Toronto.com stated that "It's a high-stakes gamble that Susan Froemke has captured [it] in all of its breast-plate-and-spear glory in a two-hour documentary that has as many hair-raising, stomach-churning moments as a ride on Wonderland's new Leviathan." Tom Huizenga of NPR called it a "meticulously unpacked if ultimately unmemorable diary of the company's high-stakes production". Steve Smith of Time Out New York says "To its credit, Wagner's Dream includes revealing footage of Promethean labors undertaken by cast and crew, misfires included."

== See also ==
- Metropolitan Opera Live in HD
