= Iris (2014 film) =

- 2015 theatrical release poster
- Directed by: Albert Maysles
- Produced by: Jennifer Ash Rudick (producer) Laura Coxson (producer); Paul Lovelace (co-producer); Rebekah Maysles (producer) Doreen G. Small (executive producer)
- Starring: Iris Apfel
- Cinematography: Albert Maysles; Nelson Walker III; Sean Price Williams
- Edited by: Paul Lovelace
- Release date: 2014

Iris is a 2014 American documentary film directed by Albert Maysles about the life of fashion icon Iris Apfel. It was one of Maysles' last films before his death in 2015.

== Release ==
Iris premiered at the 2014 New York Film Festival and was released theatrically the following year, shortly after Maysles died in March 2015. It was released on PBS's POV in 2016, after its theatrical run.

== Reception ==
On Metacritic, Iris received a score of 80, indicating "generally favorable" reviews, drawn from 25 reviews. In The New Yorker, film critic Richard Brody called the documentary "a grand, joyful testament" to both Apfel and Maysles' "artistic vision", revealing each as not only the visual artist but also the interlocutor whose commentary becomes part of the act of artistic creation.
