= The Beales of Grey Gardens =

2006 documentary film

- DVD cover
- Directed by: Albert Maysles; David Maysles; Ian Markiewicz
- Produced by: Tanja Meding
- Starring: Edith "Little Edie" Bouvier Beale; Edith Ewing Bouvier Beale
- Cinematography: Albert Maysles; David Maysles
- Edited by: Ian Markiewicz
- Production company: Maysles Films
- Distributed by: Maysles Films; The Criterion Collection
- Release date: 2006
- Running time: 91 minutes
- Country: United States
- Language: English

The Beales of Grey Gardens is a documentary film by Albert Maysles, David Maysles and Ian Markiewicz, released in 2006.

The film is a follow-up to the celebrated 1975 documentary Grey Gardens about Jackie Kennedy's aunt and cousin, "Big" Edie and "Little" Edie Beale, and is composed entirely of footage not used in the original documentary that was shot at the Beale home in East Hampton.

== Synopsis ==
The Beales of Grey Gardens gives greater insight into the simultaneously contentious and loving relationship between the mother and daughter, as well as their relationship with the young caretaker, Jerry, their multitude of cats, and Lois Wright, a friend who briefly appeared in Grey Gardens at the celebration of "Big" Edie's birthday.

It includes a dramatic scene of a small fire in the second floor hallway of the mansion, which explains the large hole in the wall shown in the first film. In an interview filmed on the front porch, "Little" Edie claims that a newspaper in East Hampton claimed that she had schizophrenia, which she denied, saying "No Beales are schizophrenic!"

Several scenes depict "Little" Edie discussing her relationship with her father, which she described as difficult; the importance of the Catholic Church in her life; the Republican Party; the renovations done to the mansion following the raid; the title of the original documentary; and the loss of several boyfriends in World War II. "Little" Edie revealed that she had not been invited to the wedding of John F. Kennedy and Jacqueline Bouvier in 1953.

Also revealed is that "Big" Edie liked "Little" Edie to change costumes ten times a day. This explains "Little" Edie's constantly changing wardrobe in the original Grey Gardens.

== Reception ==
The film has 71% "fresh" rating on Rotten Tomatoes.

== Music ==
- "You Oughta Be in Pictures"
- "Lorraine Lorraine Lorree"
- "V.M.I. March"
- "I Dream Too Much"
- "Spring Will Be a Little Late"
- "Around the World"
- "Should I Be Sweet?"
- "Don't Ever Leave Me"
- "If I Loved You"
