= Cinéma vérité =

Style of documentary filmmaking

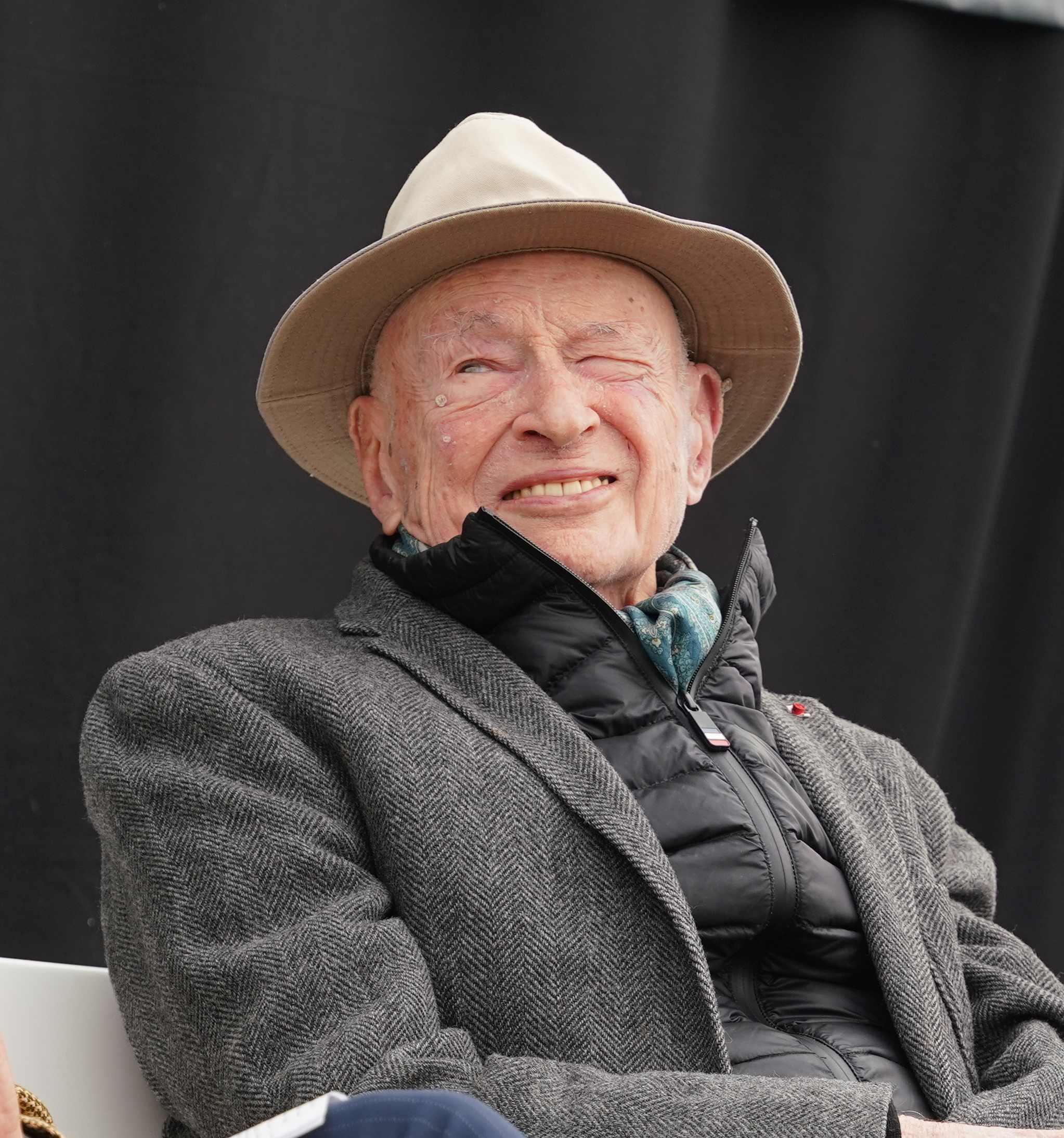
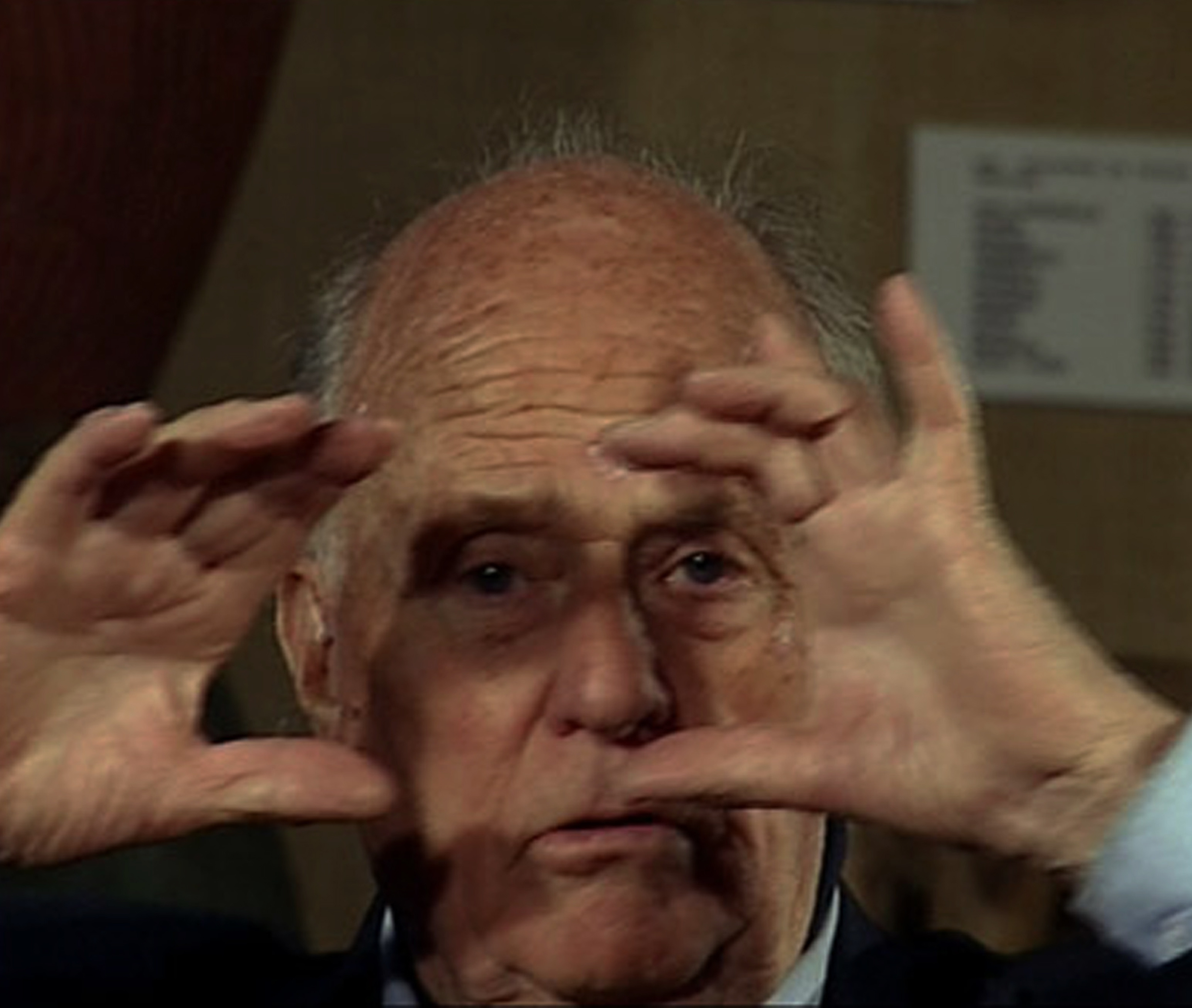
Edgar Morin (left) and Jean Rouch (right), the two founders of cinéma vérité

Cinéma vérité (UK: /ˌsɪnɪmə ˈvɛrɪteɪ/, US: /- ˌvɛrɪˈteɪ/, French: [sinema veʁite] lit. 'truth cinema' or 'truthful cinema') is a style of documentary filmmaking developed by Edgar Morin and Jean Rouch, inspired by Dziga Vertov's theory about Kino-Pravda. It combines improvisation with use of the camera to unveil truth or highlight subjects hidden behind reality. It is sometimes called observational cinema, if understood as pure direct cinema: mainly without a narrator's voice-over. There are subtle, yet important, differences between terms expressing similar concepts. Direct cinema is largely concerned with the recording of events in which the subject and audience become unaware of the camera's presence: operating within what Bill Nichols, an American historian and theoretician of documentary film, calls the "observational mode", a fly on the wall. Many therefore see a paradox in drawing attention away from the presence of the camera and simultaneously interfering in the reality it registers when attempting to discover a cinematic truth.

== History ==
Cinéma vérité can involve stylized set-ups and interaction between the filmmaker and the subject, even to the point of provocation. Some argue that the obvious presence of the filmmaker and camera was seen by most cinéma vérité filmmakers as the best way to reveal the truth. The camera is always acknowledged, for it performs the act of filming real objects, people, and events in a confrontational way. The filmmaker's intention was to represent the truth as objectively as possible, freeing the viewer from deceptions in how those aspects of life were formerly presented to them. From this perspective, the filmmaker should be the catalyst of a situation. Even among filmmakers whose works are described by these terms, there is little consensus on their meanings. The development of cinéma vérité was facilitated by advances in lightweight cameras and synchronized sound recording in the late 1950s, which enabled filmmakers to capture events with greater mobility and immediacy.

Pierre Perrault sets situations up and then films them, for example in Pour la suite du monde (1963) where he asked old people to fish for whale. The result is not a documentary about whale fishing; it is about memory and lineage. In this sense cinéma vérité is concerned with anthropological cinema, and with the social and political implications of what is captured on film. How a filmmaker shoots a film, what is being filmed, what to do with what was filmed, and how that film will be presented to an audience, all were very important for filmmakers of the time.

In all cases, the ethical and aesthetic analysis of documentary form (see docufiction) of the 1950s and 1960s has to be linked with a critical look at post-war propaganda analysis. This type of cinema is concerned with notions of truth and reality in film. Feminist documentary films of the 1970s often used cinéma-vérité techniques. This sort of "realism" was criticized for its deceptive pseudo-natural construction of reality.

Edgar Morin coined the term around the time of such essential films as 1960's Primary and his own 1961 collaboration with Jean Rouch, Chronicle of a Summer.

== Filmmakers associated with the style ==
=== Pioneers ===
- Robert Drew
- Haskell Wexler
- Richard Leacock
- D. A. Pennebaker
- Jean Rouch

=== Others ===
Sources:

- William Greaves
- Jim McBride
- Lindsay Anderson
- Sean Baker
- Tony Richardson
- Karel Reisz
- Agnes Varda
- Shirley Clarke
- Chris Marker
- Jean-Luc Godard
- Vittorio De Seta
- The Maysles Brothers (Albert and David Maysles)
- Frederick Wiseman
- John Cassavetes
- Barbara Kopple
- Les Blank
- Peter Watkins
- Matthew Heineman

== Selected cinéma-vérité films ==
- Daybreak Express (1953)
- Sea Countrymen (1955)
- Primary (1960)
- Chronicle of a Summer (1961)
- Crisis: Behind a Presidential Commitment (1963)
- Love Meetings (1964)
- Happy Mother's Day (1964)
- A Time For Burning (1966)
- Dont Look Back (1967)
- Portrait of Jason (1967)
- Titicut Follies (1967)
- Uncle Yanco (1967)
- The Blues Accordin' to Lightnin' Hopkins (1968)
- High School (1968)
- Monterey Pop (1968)
- Symbiopsychotaxiplasm: Take One (1968)
- Law and Order (1969)
- Salesman (1969)
- Gimme Shelter (1970)
- Hospital (1970)
- I Am Somebody (1970)
- Woodstock (1970)
- Mainstreet Soldier (1972)
- Christo's Valley Curtain (1973)
- A Film of Their 1973 Spring Tour Commissioned by Christian Liberation Front of Berkeley California (1974)
- Tarpon (1973)
- Italianamerican (1974)
- The Plaint of Steve Kreines as recorded by his younger brother Jeff (1974)
- A Poem Is a Naked Person (1974)
- Grey Gardens (1975)
- Harlan County U.S.A. (1976)
- Da Real Makoy (1977)
- Always for Pleasure (1978)
- Werner Herzog Eats His Shoe (1980)
- The Decline of Western Civilization (1981) and the sequel The Metal Years (1988)
- The Atomic Cafe (1982)
- Burden of Dreams (1982)
- Say Amen, Somebody (1982)
- Streetwise (1984)
- Sherman's March (1986)
- Crack USA: County Under Siege (1989)
- Bumming in Beijing (1990)
- Paris Is Burning (1990)
- American Dream (1991)
- The War Room (1993)
- Hoop Dreams (1994)
- Decasia (2002)
- Tarnation (2003)
- Control Room (2004)
- Murderball (2005)
- Waltz with Bashir (2008)
- Senna (2010)
- The Black Power Mixtape 1967–1975 (2011)
- How to Survive a Plague (2012)
- Frame by Frame (2015)
- Apollo 11 (2019)
- Dick Johnson Is Dead (2020)
- Cow (2021)
- When We Were Bullies (2021)
- Jeen-Yuhs (2022)
- Incident (2023)
- The White House Effect (2024)
- The Devil Is Busy (2025)
- The Perfect Neighbor (2025)

=== Fictional cinéma vérité–style films ===
The following are films that are fictional or semi-fictional which use cinéma vérité film-making techniques:

- The Phenix City Story (1955)
- The Savage Eye (1959)
- Cléo from 5 to 7 (1962)
- Amanita Pestilens (1963)
- A Child is Waiting (1963)
- David Holzman's Diary (1967)
- Faces (1968)
- Medium Cool (1969)
- Multiple Maniacs (1970)
- Wanda (1970)
- Scenes with Beans (1976)
- Bush Mama (1979)
- The Driller Killer (1979)
- The Fly (1980)
- This Is Spinal Tap (1984)
- Threads (1984)
- Henry: Portrait of a Serial Killer (1986)
- Bad Movie (1997)
- Slam (1998)
- Thirteen (2003)
- Take Out (2004)
- Daddy Longlegs (2009)
- Certified Copy (2010)
- Tangerine (2015)
- American Honey (2016)
- The Florida Project (2017)
- BlackBerry (2023)
- Gasoline Rainbow (2024)

== Legacy ==
Many film directors of the 1960s and later adopted use of handheld camera and other cinéma vérité aspects for their scripted, fiction films—having actors improvise to get a more spontaneous quality in their dialogue and action. Influential examples include director John Cassavetes, who broke ground with his 1968 Academy Award-nominated film Faces. The techniques of cinéma vérité can also be seen in fictional films from The Blair Witch Project to Saving Private Ryan.

Cinéma vérité was also adapted for use in scripted TV programs, such as Homicide: Life on the Street, NYPD Blue, The Shield, both the UK and American versions of The Office, Parks & Recreation and Modern Family. Documentary series are less common, but COPS is one famous non-fictional example.

It has also been a subject ripe for parodies and spoofs such as the mockumentary film This Is Spinal Tap and Emmy Award-nominated TV series Documentary Now (the latter paying homage to the style of such CV classics as Grey Gardens, Salesman and The War Room).

== See also ==
- Cinéma Vérité: Defining the Moment
- Cinema Verite – the 2011 HBO TV movie about the making of PBS's 1973 documentary series An American Family
- Ethnofiction
- Found footage (pseudo-documentary)
- Pilottone
- Sync sound
- 16 mm film
- Guerrilla filmmaking
- Dogme 95
