= Direct cinema =

Style of documentary filmmaking

Direct cinema is a documentary genre that originated between 1958 and 1962—principally in Quebec and the United States—and was developed in France by Jean Rouch. It is a cinematic practice employing lightweight portable filming equipment, hand-held cameras and live, synchronous sound that became available because of new, ground-breaking technologies developed in the early 1960s. These innovations made it possible for independent filmmakers to do away with a truckload of optical sound-recording, large crews, studio sets, tripod-mounted equipment and special lights, expensive necessities that severely hog-tied these low-budget documentarians. It has drawn comparisons with related ideas from other national cinemas and documentary movements like the French cinéma vérité genre and the contemporaneous British free cinema movement. As in cinéma vérité, direct cinema was initially characterized by filmmakers' desire to capture reality directly, to represent it truthfully, and to question the relationship between reality and cinema.

== Origins ==
"Direct cinema is the result of two predominant and related factors—The desire for a new cinematic realism and the development of the equipment necessary to achieving that desire" (Monaco 2003, p. 206). Many technological, ideological and social aspects contribute to the direct cinema movement and its place in the history of cinema.

=== Lightweight cameras ===
Direct cinema was made possible, in part, by the advent of light, portable cameras, which allowed the hand-held camera and more intimacy in the filmmaking. It also produced movements that are the style's visual trademark. The first cameras of this type were German cameras, designed for ethnographic cinematography. The company Arriflex was considered the first to widely commercialize such cameras, that were improved for aerial and battlefield photography during World War II. Easily available, portable cameras played an important part, but the existence of these cameras in itself did not trigger the birth of direct cinema.

=== Objective truthfulness ===
The idea of cinema as an objective space has been present since its birth. The Kino-Pravda (literally "Cinema Truth") practice of Dziga Vertov, which can be traced back to the 1920s, gave an articulated voice to this notion, where one can also see the influence of futurism.

Before the 1960s and the advent of direct cinema, the concepts of propaganda, film education and documentary were loosely defined in the public. Cinema in its ontological objectivity was seen by many viewers as reality captured and a means of universal education, as had been photography in its early period. Documentaries from the 1950s provide insight into the level of understanding that viewers of that day had of manipulation and mise-en-scène in films shot on "documentary sets." Direct cinema gained its importance in the perspective of the popular evolution of ideas about reality and the media.

=== Sound before the 1960s ===
Before the use of pilottone sync-sound (invented in 1954) and the 1961 Nagra III, sound recording machinery was either extremely heavy or unreliable. Many attempts were made to solve this problem during the 1950s and 1960s. At the National Film Board of Canada (NFB), for example, a system called "Sprocketape" was designed, but was not implemented.

In the best case scenario, documentary sound was recorded before, in interviews, or much later on location, with a portable studio located in a sound-proofed truck. The sounds that were captured were later synched (synchronized) in sound editing, thus providing the film with sound. In other cases, the soundtrack was recorded, as in fiction films: with layers of ambient sound, archival sound effects, foley, and post-synced voices.

In other cases the documentary subject was brought into a studio. Sound taken directly from the studio made the documentary nature of the recording arguable. For example, a production might reconstruct a stable in the studio, with a sound engineer close by in a soundproof booth. This mimics the production of some studio films and TV series, but often results in surreal situations, such as cows being in a studio for a documentary on farming, rather than in their natural habitat.

Synchronized sound was used by French filmmaker Jean Rouch in 1960 when he shot Chronicle of a Summer, a landmark film in direct cinema history, in style of cinéma-vérité, using a 16 mm camera connected through pilottone with a prototype of Nagra III, a transistorized magnetic-tape recorder with electronic speed control, developed by Stefan Kudelski.

== Ideological and social aspects ==
With improved sound, lighting and camera equipment available, the technical conditions necessary for the advent of direct cinema were present. The social and ideological conditions that led to direct cinema also appeared.

Direct cinema seemed to reflect this new attitude. It emerged from a desire to compare common opinion with reality. It attempted to show how things really are, outside the studio, far from the editorial control of the establishment—be it governmental or big press. What was noteworthy was that the desire to test common opinion and show reality was constantly kept in check with an acute awareness that it is easy to lie with sound and image. This tension was at the center of direct cinema and resulted in its formal style and methodology.

=== The elusive recipe of reality captured ===
The awareness of cinema's potential to lie would result in filmmakers' trying precise ways of shooting. For Michel Brault of the National Film Board of Canada, who pioneered modern hand-held camera work, it meant the ability to go amidst the people with a wide angle. Other filmmakers would develop different methods. Some insisted that their subject needed to get used to them before they started any real shooting, so it would seem the camera was being ignored Still another group of direct cinema filmmakers would claim that the most honest technique was for a filmmaker to accept the camera as a catalyst and acknowledge that it provoked reactions. This allowed filmmakers to feel free to ask their film subject to do something they would like to document.

The desire to capture reality led to some questioning the ability of filmmakers to properly film someone whom they could not fully understand. As an example, Jean Rouch went so far as to hand the camera to the "subject" (and co-author) of Moi, un Noir.

Regardless of these practices, one thing is certain: direct cinema had more to do with the ethical considerations in documentary film making than with the technology. This could explain why the movement began in two North American societies that were in social and ideological mutation, French Canada (Quebec) and the United States, before spreading to South America and France.

== Regional variants ==
=== Quebec ===
Direct cinema began in 1958 at the National Film Board of Canada in Quebec, at the dawning of the Quiet Revolution, a period of intense social and political change.

At that time, a university education was a rare thing for a Québécois. The people of Quebec were seen by its young emerging intelligentsia as alienated and abused. This period of complex cultural and economical change for French-speaking Quebecers can be summarized by the convergence of three phenomena:

- The advent of a welfare state in Quebec accompanying its institutional Anglicization.
- A nationalist and social movement fighting ethnic discrimination against Canadians of French origins.
- The important industrialization and socio-economic change brought both by the baby boom and by the extraordinary post-war wealth (1945–1975) in Quebec (and Canada) meant the end of a more traditional rural life.

The consequences of these three movements deeply modified Quebec society and resulted in a myriad of perspectives by intellectuals and artists in their colonized society. Filmmakers would simultaneously try to share their social conscience, improve the living conditions of the Québécois and attempt to bring national independence—provoking, documenting this transformation, and at the same time keeping a record of disappearing traditions in a rapidly changing society. The landmark 1958 film The Snowshoers (Les Raquetteurs), co-directed by Michel Brault and Gilles Groulx, is a key example, as is Groulx's 1961 Golden Gloves.

Direct cinema techniques were also incorporated into a number of key fiction films of the period, such as The Cat in the Bag (Le Chat dans le sac) (1964) and La vie heureuse de Léopold Z (1965).

=== United States ===
In the United States, Robert Drew, a journalist with Life magazine after the war, decided to apply the photojournalist method to movies. He founded Drew Associates, which included Richard Leacock, D.A. Pennebaker, Terence Macartney-Filgate, and Albert and David Maysles. They started experimenting with technology, syncing camera and sound with the parts of a watch. In 1960, this group produced three films for Time-Life Broadcast: Yanqui, No!, Eddie (On the Pole), and Primary.

Yanqui, No! focused on South America and its tense relations with the U.S. It documented the underlying anti-American sentiment in the population. Primary (a documentary about the 1960 Wisconsin Democratic presidential primary campaign between Senators John F. Kennedy and Hubert H. Humphrey), helped define direct cinema style and made it known to a wide public with the help of Time-Life Broadcast. The film reveals how primary elections worked in the U.S. at the time and raised the profile of direct cinema. After these hotly debated experiments, Time Life Broadcast withdrew from its agreement with Drew Associates. Drew Associates would continue on its own.

On June 11, 1963, the Alabama Governor George Wallace blocked the entrance of the University of Alabama to oppose integration. His defiance of court order rapidly became a national issue in the U.S. Drew Associates had a cameraman in the Oval office and recorded the meetings over the crisis. The result played on TV in October 1963. Crisis: Behind a Presidential Commitment not only fueled discussions over the Civil Rights Movement, it also triggered a profound questioning over the political power of direct cinema. Politicians became more cautious about allowing access by documentary filmmakers.

== Direct cinema and cinéma vérité ==
Cinéma vérité has many resemblances to direct cinema. The hand-held style of camera work is the same. There is a similar feeling of real life unfolding before the viewer's eyes. There is also a mutual concern with social and ethical questions. Both cinéma vérité and direct cinema rely on the power of editing to give shape, structure and meaning to the material recorded. Some film historians have characterized the direct cinema movement as a North American version of the cinéma vérité movement. The latter was exemplified in France with Jean Rouch's Chronicle of a Summer (1961). For these historians cinéma vérité is characterized by the use of the camera to provoke and reveal.

Direct cinema, on the other hand, has been seen as more strictly observational. It relies on an agreement among the filmmaker, subjects and audience to act as if the presence of the camera does not substantially alter the recorded event. Such claims of non-intervention have been criticized by critics and historians.

=== Filmmakers' opinions ===
In a 2003 interview (Zuber), Robert Drew explained how he saw the differences between cinéma vérité and direct cinema:

I had made Primary and a few other films. Then I went to France with Leacock for a conference [the 1963 meeting sponsored by Radio Television Française]. I was surprised to see the Cinema vérité filmmakers accosting people on the street with a microphone (Chronicle of a Summer). My goal was to capture real life without intruding. Between us there was a contradiction. It made no sense. They had a cameraman, a sound man, and about six more—a total of eight men creeping through the scenes. It was a little like the Marx Brothers. My idea was to have one or two people, unobtrusive, capturing the moment.

Jean Rouch claimed cinéma vérité came from Brault and the NFB. Yet the NFB pioneers of the form Brault, Pierre Perrault and the others, never used the term cinéma vérité to describe their work and, in fact, found the term pretentious. They preferred "Cinéma Direct". Cinema vérité, the phrase and the form, can thus be seen as France's spin on the idea of the Cinéma Direct of Brault and his colleagues of the French section of the NFB in Canada.

Cinéma vérité came to be a term applied in English to everything from a school of thought, to a film style, and a look adopted by commercials.

== Examples of direct cinema documentaries ==
- On the Bowery – Lionel Rogosin, 1956 (docufiction)
- Crisis: Behind a Presidential Commitment – Robert Drew, 1963
- The Chair – Robert Drew, 1963
- Pour la suite du monde - Michel Brault & Pierre Perrault, 1963
- The Mills of the Gods: Viet Nam – Beryl Fox, 1965
- Meet Marlon Brando – Albert and David Maysles, 1966
- Dont Look Back – D. A. Pennebaker, 1967
- Festival! - Murray Lerner, 1967
- Titicut Follies – Frederick Wiseman, 1967
- Chiefs – Richard Leacock, 1968
- Monterey Pop - D. A. Pennebaker, 1968
- Kid Sentiment - Jacques Godbout, 1968
- Salesman – Albert and David Maysles, Charlotte Zwerin, 1969
- Gimme Shelter – Albert and David Maysles, Charlotte Zwerin, 1970
- Tread – Richard Leacock, 1972
- Grey Gardens – Albert and David Maysles, 1976
- Brother's Keeper – Joe Berlinger and Bruce Sinofsky, 1992
- Neukölln Unlimited – Agostino Imondi and Dietmar Ratsch, 2010
- Sofia's Last Ambulance – Ilian Metev, 2012
- Paraiso – Nash Ang, 2015
- Honeyland – Tamara Kotevska and Ljubomir Stefanov, 2019
- Smoke Sauna Sisterhood – Anna Hints, 2023

== "Direct cinema" fiction ==
- No Lies – Mitchell Block, (1973) (an example of a fictional direct cinema work)

== See also ==
- Cinema vérité
- Free Cinema
- Ethnofiction
- Fly on the wall
