= Cinéma Vérité: Defining the Moment =

1999 documentary film directed by Peter Wintonick

- Directed by: Peter Wintonick
- Written by: Kirwan Cox
- Produced by: Adam Symansky; Éric Michel
- Cinematography: Francis Miquet
- Edited by: Marlo Miazga
- Production company: National Film Board of Canada
- Release date: September 1999 (Vancouver International Film Festival)
- Running time: 103 minutes
- Country: Canada
- Language: English

Cinéma Vérité: Defining the Moment is 1999 Canadian documentary film directed by Peter Wintonick about cinéma vérité filmmaking. The film looks at the work of such notable documentary filmmakers as Jean Rouch, Frederick Wiseman, and Barbara Kopple and Robert Drew, as well as the contributions of the National Film Board of Canada through such films as Lonely Boy. The film also looks at the influence of cinéma vérité on the pioneering found footage horror film The Blair Witch Project, and interviews video-auteur Floria Sigismondi. Cinéma Vérité: Defining the Moment was produced by the NFB.
