= Grey Gardens =

1975 documentary film by Albert and David Maysles

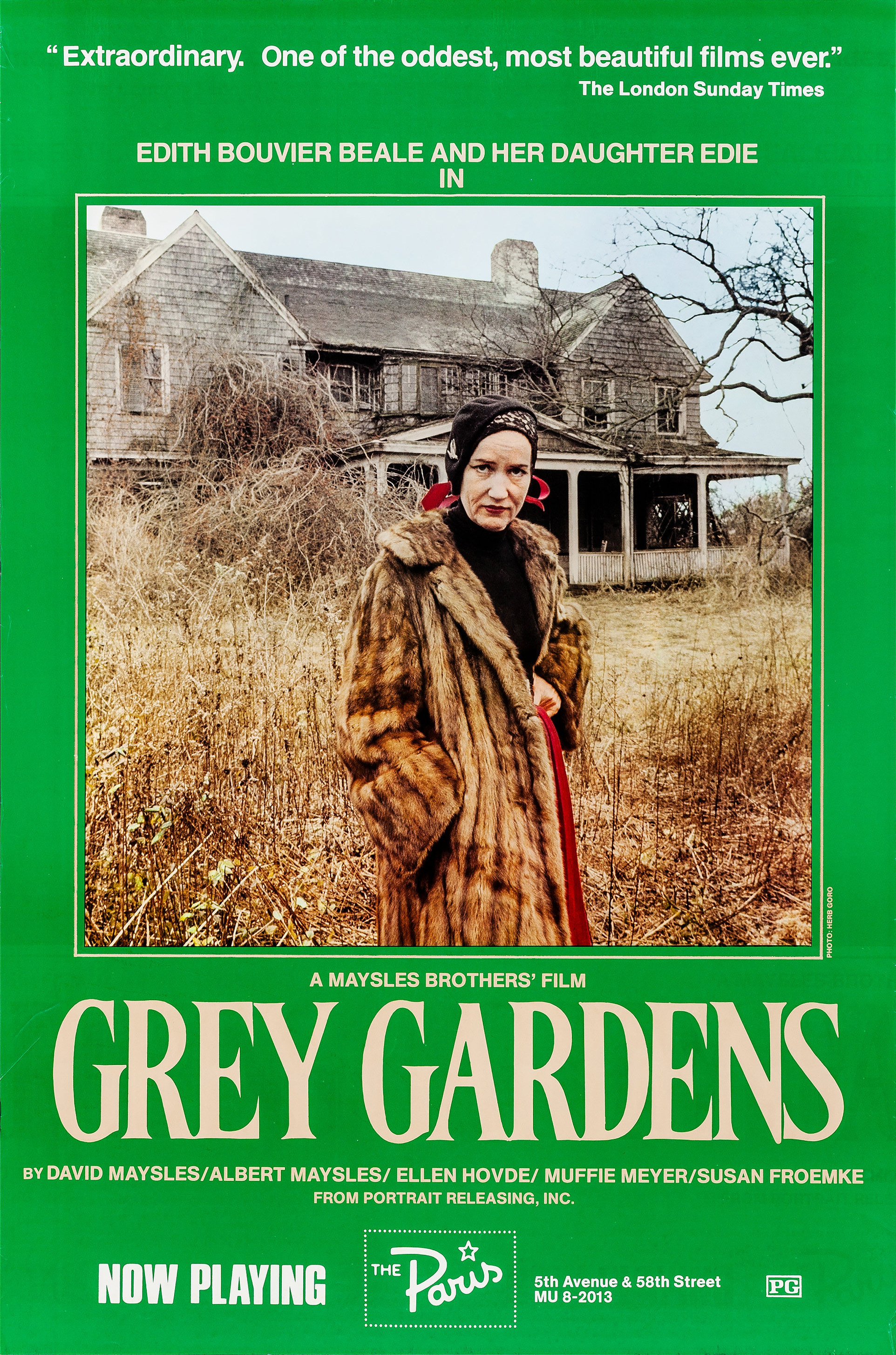
- Theatrical release poster
- Directed by: David Maysles; Albert Maysles; Ellen Hovde; Muffie Meyer
- Produced by: Albert Maysles; David Maysles; Susan Froemke (associate producer)
- Starring: Edith "Big Edie" Ewing Bouvier Beale; Edith "Little Edie" Bouvier Beale
- Cinematography: Albert Maysles; David Maysles
- Edited by: Ellen Hovde; Muffie Meyer; Susan Froemke
- Production company: Portrait Films
- Distributed by: Portrait Films
- Release dates: September 27, 1975 (NYFF); February 19, 1976 (United States)
- Running time: 95 minutes
- Country: United States
- Language: English
- Box office: $36,923 (2015 release)

Grey Gardens is a 1975 American documentary film by Albert and David Maysles. The film depicts the everyday lives of two reclusive, upper-class women, a mother and daughter both named Edith Beale, who lived in poverty at Grey Gardens, a derelict mansion at 3 West End Road in the wealthy Georgica Pond neighborhood of East Hampton, New York. The film was screened at the 1976 Cannes Film Festival but was not entered into the main competition.

Ellen Hovde and Muffie Meyer also directed, and Susan Froemke was the associate producer. The film was edited by Hovde, Meyer and Froemke.

In 2010, the film was selected by the Library of Congress for preservation in the United States National Film Registry as being "culturally, historically, or aesthetically significant", and in the 2014 Sight and Sound poll film critics voted Grey Gardens the tenth-best documentary film of all time. In November 2012, it topped the list of 100 greatest documentary films of all time by PBS through public voting.

== Cast ==
- Edith "Big Edie" Ewing Bouvier Beale as herself
- Edith "Little Edie" Bouvier Beale as herself
- Brooks Hyers as himself—Gardener
- Jerry Torre as himself-Handyman
- Norman Vincent Peale as himself (voice)
- Jack Helmuth as himself—Birthday Guest (uncredited)
- Albert Maysles as himself (uncredited)
- David Maysles as himself (uncredited)
- Lois Wright as herself—Birthday Guest (uncredited)

== Background ==
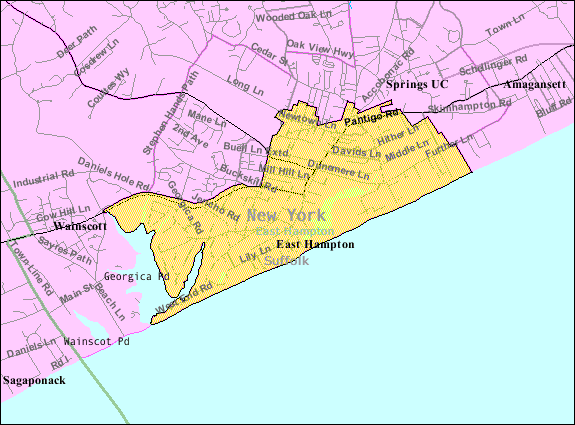
Map of East Hampton; the Beales lived at Georgica Pond in the southwest of the village.

Edith Ewing Bouvier Beale (1895–1977), known as "Big Edie", and her daughter Edith Bouvier Beale (1917–2002), known as "Little Edie", were the aunt and the first cousin, respectively, of former US First Lady Jacqueline Kennedy Onassis. The two women lived together at the Grey Gardens estate for decades with limited funds in increasing squalor and isolation.

The house was designed in 1897 by Joseph Greenleaf Thorpe and purchased in 1923 by "Big Edie" and her husband Phelan Beale. After Phelan left his wife, "Big Edie" and "Little Edie" lived there for more than 50 years. The house was called Grey Gardens because of the color of the dunes, the concrete garden walls, and the sea mist.

Throughout the fall of 1971 and into 1972, their living conditions—their house was infested by fleas, inhabited by numerous cats and raccoons, deprived of running water, and filled with garbage and decay—were exposed as the result of an article in the National Enquirer and a cover story in New York Magazine after a series of inspections (which the Beales called "raids") by the Suffolk County Health Department. With the Beale women facing eviction and the razing of their house, in the summer of 1972 Jacqueline Onassis and her sister Lee Radziwill provided the necessary funds to stabilize and repair the dilapidated house so that it would meet village codes.

Albert and David Maysles became interested in their story and received permission to film a documentary about the women, which was released in 1976 to wide critical acclaim. Their direct cinema technique left the women to tell their own stories.

== Production ==
Albert and David Maysles came into contact with the Beales in 1972 after Lee Radziwill suggested they make a documentary on her childhood in East Hampton and took them with her on a trip to Grey Gardens. The initial film was funded by Radziwill but was eventually shelved and the footage was lost. The Maysles brothers returned in 1974 without Radziwill's support to film Grey Gardens.

== Aftermath ==
"Big Edie" died in 1977, and "Little Edie" sold the house in 1979 for $220,000 (equivalent to $976,000 in 2025) to Sally Quinn and her husband, longtime Washington Post editor Ben Bradlee, who promised to restore the dilapidated structure (the sale agreement forbade razing the house). The couple restored the house and grounds. "Little Edie" died in Florida in 2002 at the age of 84.

Jerry Torre, the teenage handyman shown in the documentary (nicknamed "The Marble Faun" by "Little Edie"), was sought by the filmmakers for years afterward, and was found by chance in 2005 driving a New York City taxicab. A 2011 documentary, The Marble Faun of Grey Gardens, by Jason Hay and Steve Pelizza, showed that he was then a sculptor at the Art Students League of New York.

Lois Wright, one of the two birthday party guests in the film, hosted a public television show for 30 years in East Hampton from the early 1980s to December 2018. She wrote a book about her experiences at the house with the Beales.

In 2006, Maysles made available previously unreleased footage for a special two-disc edition for the Criterion Collection. It included a new feature titled The Beales of Grey Gardens, which also received a limited theatrical release.

Previously lost footage shot in 1972, using 16mm film, featuring Lee Radziwill visiting with the Beales, was released in 2017 as That Summer.

Quinn and Bradlee resided in the restored Grey Gardens for 35 years until Bradlee's death in 2014, after which Quinn found the home "too sad" to occupy alone. For the next several years, the property was available to rent until Quinn sold it in 2017. Prior to the sale, Quinn was forced to sell the remaining furniture originally belonging to the Beales, citing a lack of space. As of 2017, fashion designer Liz Lange is the owner of Grey Gardens. Lange and her husband have extensively remodeled the house, including lifting the house on stilts to create a basement in the existing crawlspace. The gardens surrounding the property have also been remodeled.

== Reception ==
On the review aggregator website Rotten Tomatoes, 94% of 36 critics' reviews are positive, with an average rating of 8.6/10. The website's consensus reads: "Edith and Edie Beale are eccentric subjects who offer a generous amount of themselves in Grey Gardens, an inquisitive and nonjudgmental exploration of the isolated socialites' lifestyle." Metacritic, which uses a weighted average, assigned the film a score of 83 out of 100, based on 16 critics, indicating "universal acclaim".

== Controversy ==
Ethical questions have been raised about Grey Gardens since its release. In 1976, Walter Goodman wrote in The New York Times that "the film presents [the Beales] as a pair of grotesques," and asked "why were they put on exhibition this way?" In 2014, in conversation with Alex Simon for The Hollywood Interview, Albert Maysles was asked specifically about the issue of exploitation: "Grey Gardens was very controversial when it was initially released, with some circles feeling you and David were exploiting these two women who seemed to be mentally ill." Maysles replied that "as someone with a background in psychology, I knew better than to claim [the Beales] were mentally ill. Their behavior was just their way of asserting themselves. And what could be a better way to assert themselves than a film about them asserting themselves? Nothing more, nothing less. It’s just them. They were always in control." Nevertheless, the matter has continued to be the subject of debate, with some commentators coming down on the side of exploitation, others on the side of empathy. In at least one case, it was concluded that both exploitation and empathy were to be found in the film.

In his article, Goodman also pointed out that the Beales were represented in negotiations with the Maysles by their family lawyer and that they were "paid for their cooperation and are due to participate in any profits." Adam White, writing for The Telegraph in 2018, reported that "The Beales' reasoning for allowing the cameras in was also practical: they were in dire need of money." In the context of documentary making, paying one's subjects has long been a source of ethical debate in terms of how it impacts the final work.

== Adaptations ==
=== Musical theatre ===
The documentary, and the women's story, were adapted as a full-length musical, Grey Gardens, with book by Doug Wright, music by Scott Frankel and lyrics by Michael Korie. Starring Christine Ebersole and Mary Louise Wilson, the show premiered at Playwrights Horizons in New York City in February 2006. The musical re-opened on Broadway in November 2006 at the Walter Kerr Theatre, and was included in more than 25 "Best of 2006" lists in newspapers and magazines. The production won a Tony Award for Best Costume Design, and Ebersole and Wilson each won Tony Awards for their performances. The Broadway production closed on July 29, 2007. It was the first musical on Broadway ever to be adapted from a documentary.

A new Australian adaptation of the women's story, House of Rot: Grey Gardens, by Dino Dimitriadis and Victoria Falconer was created in 2025. 'Weaving original compositions with new interpretations of known songs both contemporary and classic.' The first production at The Malthouse Theatre in 2026 will star Paul Capsis and Adam Noviello as Big Edie and Little Edie respectively.

=== Television film ===
Grey Gardens, an HBO film, stars Jessica Lange and Drew Barrymore as the Edies, with Jeanne Tripplehorn as Jacqueline Kennedy, and Daniel Baldwin as Julius Krug. Directed and co-written (with Patricia Rozema) by filmmaker Michael Sucsy, filming began on October 22, 2007, in Toronto. It flashes back and forth between Little Edie's life as a young woman and the actual filming/premiere of the 1975 documentary. First aired on HBO on April 18, 2009, the film won three Primetime Emmys and two Golden Globes.
