= Primary (film) =

1960 Robert Drew documentary about Wisconsin Democratic Primary

- Cover of DVD release
- Directed by: Robert Drew
- Written by: Robert Drew
- Produced by: Robert Drew
- Starring: John F. Kennedy; Hubert Humphrey; Joseph Julian (narrator)
- Cinematography: Richard Leacock; D. A. Pennebaker; Terence Macartney-Filgate; Albert Maysles
- Edited by: Robert Drew; Richard Leacock; D. A. Pennebaker; Terence Macartney-Filgate; Robert Farren
- Color process: black and white
- Distributed by: Time Life Television
- Release date: 1960
- Running time: 60 minutes
- Country: United States
- Language: English

Primary is a 1960 American direct cinema documentary film directed by Robert Drew about the April 5, 1960 primary election in Wisconsin between Democratic Party candidates John F. Kennedy and Hubert Humphrey. They were vying to be chosen as their party's nominee in the upcoming general election. The film covers the last hectic days and hours of the primary campaign.

== Production ==
Primary was produced by Robert Drew and his newly formed film company Drew Associates. The camera crew included Richard Leacock, D. A. Pennebaker, Terence Macartney-Filgate, and Albert Maysles. The resulting work was a breakthrough in documentary film style, and in providing an inside look at a political campaign. Through the use of mobile cameras and lightweight sound equipment, the filmmakers were able to follow the candidates as they greeted and shook hands with every Wisconsin voter they encountered, wound their way through cheering supporters, crammed into cars and crowded hotel rooms, and awaited the election outcome with tense expressions. This approach offered a greater intimacy than was possible with older techniques of documentary filmmaking, and it established what has since become the standard style of video reporting.

== Release ==
Primary got a theatrical release in Europe but not in the United States, nor was it broadcast on either of the three national U.S. television networks or commented on by critics. It was only shown on a few stations owned by Time Life Television and RKO-General, and on some independent stations in major American cities.

== Legacy ==
Due to its limited release, Primary was not seen at the time by a large audience. Many of those who did seek it out were other filmmakers and, as Matt Zoller Seitz wrote in a 2015 retrospective, they were stunned by what they saw:

a documentary with no title cards, no onscreen host, little narration and almost no music. They saw a nonfiction film that was more concerned with observing people in action than in verbally summarizing them. Drew and his collaborators simply hung out with the candidates and observed them interacting with voters and the press, or absorbing information from staffers, or eating lunch, or riding on a bus looking out the window at livestock zipping by. It was all so simple that it felt revolutionary.

In 1990, the film was selected for preservation in the United States National Film Registry by the Library of Congress as being "culturally, historically, or aesthetically significant". It was also preserved in 1998 by the Academy Film Archive. The importance of Drew's film in the evolution of documentaries was explored in Cinéma Vérité: Defining the Moment (1999). In 2019, MoMA exhibited Primary alongside the 1963 documentary Showman directed by Albert and David Maysles.

== See also ==
- U.S. presidential election, 1960
- Direct cinema
- Cultural depictions of John F. Kennedy
- Cinéma vérité
