= Christo's Valley Curtain =

1974 film

- Directed by: Albert and David Maysles; Ellen Giffard
- Produced by: Albert and David Maysles; Thomas Handloser
- Cinematography: Albert Maysles
- Production company: Maysles Films
- Distributed by: Maysles Films
- Release date: 1974
- Running time: 28 minutes
- Country: United States
- Language: English

Christo's Valley Curtain is a 1974 American short documentary film directed by Albert and David Maysles, about Christo and Jeanne-Claude's Valley Curtain project.

== Accolades ==
It was nominated for an Academy Award for Best Documentary Short.
