= Susan Froemke =

American film director and producer (born 1947)

External videos
- "The Opera House" documentary by Susan Froemke The Opera House

Susan Froemke (born November 5, 1947) is an American film director and producer.

Froemke was the associate producer and one of the editors of the influential 1975 documentary film Grey Gardens, which was selected for preservation in the National Film Registry in 2010. The 2001 documentary LaLee's Kin: The Legacy of Cotton, which she co-directed with Deborah Dickson, was nominated for an Academy Award for Best Documentary Feature. She made Wagner's Dream in 2012. Her most recent film is 2017's The Opera House.

In 2002, Froemke received a Grammy Award for Best Long Form Music Video for her work on Recording the Producers – A Musical Romp with Mel Brooks. Froemke received a Cinema Eye Honors Legacy Award in 2011 for her work on Grey Gardens. She divides her time between East Hampton, where Grey Gardens is set, and Manhattan.

From 2009 to 2012, Froemke collaborated with Matthew Heineman on Escape Fire: The Fight to Rescue American Healthcare, which premiered at the 2012 Sundance Film Festival. The film was later released in theaters by Roadside Attractions October 5.
