= Robert Drew =

American documentary filmmaker (1924–2014)

- Born: Robert Lincoln Drew; February 15, 1924; Toledo, Ohio, U.S.
- Died: July 30, 2014 (aged 90); Sharon, Connecticut, U.S.
- Occupation: Documentary filmmaker
- Years active: 1955–2014
- Spouse(s): Ruth Faris (m. 1945, divorced) Anne Gilbert (m. 1969)
- Children: 3

Robert Lincoln Drew (February 15, 1924 – July 30, 2014) was an American documentary filmmaker known as a pioneer—and sometimes called the father—of cinéma vérité, or direct cinema, in the United States. Two of his films, Primary (1960) and Crisis: Behind a Presidential Commitment (1963), were named to the National Film Registry of the Library of Congress. In 1993 he was a recipient of the Career Achievement Award from the International Documentary Association.

== Biography ==
Robert Drew was born in Toledo, Ohio. His father, Robert Woodsen Drew, was a film salesman and a pilot who ran a seaplane business. Drew grew up mostly in Fort Thomas, Kentucky. In 1942 he left high school to join the U.S. Army Air Corps as a cadet and qualified for officer's training. At the age of 19, he was a combat pilot in Italy flying the P-51 dive bomber, completing 30 successful combat missions. During that time, he met Ernie Pyle, an important experience for a pilot who would become a journalist. Drew was shot down behind enemy lines, where he survived for more than three months. After returning to the U.S., he was a pilot in the 1st Fighter Group, the first to fly jet airplanes. He wrote an article for Life magazine about the experience flying a P-80 and was subsequently offered a job with the magazine.

Drew said in a 1993 interview that as far back as the late 1940s, "I began thinking about developing a kind of film journalism that was as flexible as candid photography". While working as a writer and editor at Life, he won Harvard University's Nieman Fellowship for journalism. During his Nieman year in 1955, he focused on two questions: Why are documentaries so dull? What would it take for them to become gripping and exciting? His answers were "that documentaries, with their stitched-together footage and stilted narration, had been little more than lectures, and that television had the ability to draw audiences into dramatic stories with an immediacy it had yet to exploit."

He formed a unit within Time Inc. with the aim of creating documentary films that would use picture logic rather than word logic. As he articulated it, he envisioned a type of documentary that would "find a dramatic logic in which things really happened". It would be "a theater without actors; it would be plays without playwrights; it would be reporting without summary and opinion; it would be the ability to look in on people's lives at crucial times from which you could deduce certain things and see a kind of truth that can only be gotten from personal experience." To realize his vision, he needed lightweight camera equipment that operated silently, along with recorded synchronized sound. He was able to persuade Time Inc. to finance development of the new equipment.

Some of Drew's early short-form documentaries premiered on The Ed Sullivan Show and The Jack Paar Tonight Show. In 1960, he founded Drew Associates and recruited like-minded filmmakers including Richard Leacock, D. A. Pennebaker, Terence Macartney-Filgate, and Albert Maysles, all of whom went on to their own celebrated careers. They experimented with new technology, for example, syncing camera and sound with the parts of a watch.

Among the best-known works of Drew Associates is Primary (1960), a documentary about the April 1960 Wisconsin primary election between Democratic Party candidates Hubert Humphrey and John F. Kennedy. It is considered one of the first direct cinema documentaries. For the film, Drew had Mitch Bogdanovich make smaller 16mm cameras, which allowed for hand-held use and a much closer look at political candidates and campaigning than was previously possible. According to critic Matt Zoller Seitz, Primary "had as immense and measurable an impact on nonfiction filmmaking as Birth of a Nation had on fiction filmmaking."

After Kennedy responded positively to Primary, Drew "proposed to make a next film on him as a President having to deal with a crisis. 'Yes,' he said, 'What if I could look back and see what went on in the White House in the 24 hours before Roosevelt declared war on Japan?'" They got their chance in spring of 1963 when Governor George Wallace of Alabama pledged, as a show of support for segregation, to personally stand in the doorway to block enrollment of the first two African-American students at the University of Alabama. Drew secured permission for his camera crews to film in the White House and in the office of Attorney General Robert Kennedy, as well as in Alabama at the home of Governor Wallace and at the university. The film footage covers the days leading up to June 11, 1963, when Wallace made his infamous stand. The resulting film, Crisis: Behind a Presidential Commitment, aired on TV in October 1963 and fueled discussions about the Civil Rights Movement. It also raised questions about cinéma vérité, and whether the people being filmed alter their behavior out of self-consciousness or a desire to manipulate the process.

Over the course of his career, Drew made scores of documentaries and won numerous awards, including an Emmy for Man Who Dances (1968) about the ballet dancer Edward Villella. Drew's films were shown on ABC, PBS, the BBC, and at international film festivals. His subjects included politics, civil rights, social and environmental issues, and the arts. One of his last documentaries was From Two Men and a War (2005), which recounts his experiences as a World War II fighter pilot and his encounters with the Pulitzer Prize-winning reporter Ernie Pyle.

Drew's second wife, Anne Gilbert, was a documentarian at Drew Associates and often worked with her husband on film projects. His extended family member Sybil Drew also became a journalist and documentarian. Director Sir Ridley Scott credited his early experience working as an assistant at Drew Associates with turning his career from design to film.

== Death ==
Robert Drew died on July 30, 2014, at his home in Sharon, Connecticut. He was 90.

== Legacy ==
In a statement after Drew's death, documentarian Michael Moore said, "Modern art has Picasso, rock 'n' roll has Bill Haley, and the documentary film has Robert Drew. All of us who make nonfiction movies can trace our lineage to what he created."

The film and video collection of Robert Drew is housed at the Academy Film Archive. The Archive has preserved a number of his films, including Primary, Crisis: Behind a Presidential Commitment, Faces of November, Herself: Indira Gandhi, and Bravo! / Kathy's Dance.

== Select filmography ==
Who's Out There? (1973), an award-winning NASA documentary film by Robert Drew about the likelihood of life on other planets

Year	Title	Notes
1954	Key Picture (Magazine X)	
1957	American Football	
1957	The B-52	
1958	Balloon Ascension	
1958	Weightless	
1959	Bullfight	
1960	On the Pole	
1960	Yanki No!	
1960	Primary	Best Documentary, Flaherty Award; Blue Ribbon Award, American Film Festival; Outstanding Film, London Film Festival; National Film Registry, Library of Congress
1961	Adventures on the New Frontier	
1961	The Children Were Watching	
1961	Petey and Johnny	Outstanding Film, London Film Festival
1961	Mooney vs. Fowle	Outstanding Film, London Film Festival
1961	On the Pole: Eddie Sachs	
1962	The Chair	First Prize, Cannes Film Festival
1962	Blackie	
1962	Nehru	
1962	The Aga Khan	
1962	Susan Starr	
1962	Jane	
1963	Crisis: Behind a Presidential Commitment	National Film Registry, Library of Congress; First prize, Venice Film Festival; Cine Golden Eagle; First Prize, International Documentary Film Festival, Bilbao
1964	Faces of November	First prize, Venice Film Festival
1966	Storm Signal	First prize, Venice Film Festival
1968	Man Who Dances	First Prize, International Cinema Exhibition, Bilbao, Cine Golden Eagle; Emmy Award, National Academy of Television Arts and Sciences
1968	On the Road with Duke Ellington	Cine Golden Eagle
1968	The New Met	First Prize, International Cinema Exhibition, Bilbao; Cine Golden Eagle
1969	Jazz: The Intimate Art	Cine Golden Eagle
1969	The Space Duet of Spider and Gumdrop	Cine Golden Eagle
1969	Martian Investigations	Cine Golden Eagle
1969	The Sun Ship Game	Cine Golden Eagle
1973	Who's Out There?	Cine Golden Eagle
1976	Parade of the Tall Ships	Cine Golden Eagle
1977	Kathy's Dance	Cine Golden Eagle; Silver Hugo, Chicago Film Festival; Blue Ribbon Award, American Film Festival
1978	Talent for America	
1979	Grasshopper Plague	
1979	Maine Winter	
1979	One Room Schoolhouse	
1982	784 Days That Changed America: From Watergate to Resignation	Peabody Award; American Bar Association Silver Gavel Award; International Film and TV Festival of New York Gold Award
1982	Herself, Indira Gandhi	Cine Golden Eagle
1982	Fire Season	
1984	Warning from Gangland	
1984	Marshall High Fights Back	Cine Golden Eagle; Nomination, Emmy Award; First Prize, Education Writers Association
1985	Shootout on Imperial Highway	
1986	For Auction: An American Hero	Best Documentary, Alfred I. duPont–Columbia University Award; Cine Golden Eagle; Nominee, Emmy Award
1988	River of Hawks	
1988	Your Flight is Cancelled	
1988	Messages from the Birds	
1990	London to Peking: The Great Motoring Challenge	
1991	Life and Death of a Dynasty	Cine Golden Eagle
1996	L.A. Champions	
1996	On the Trail of the Vanishing Birds	
2005	From Two Men and a War	
2008	A President to Remember: In the Company of JFK	
