= Richard Leacock =

British documentary filmmaker

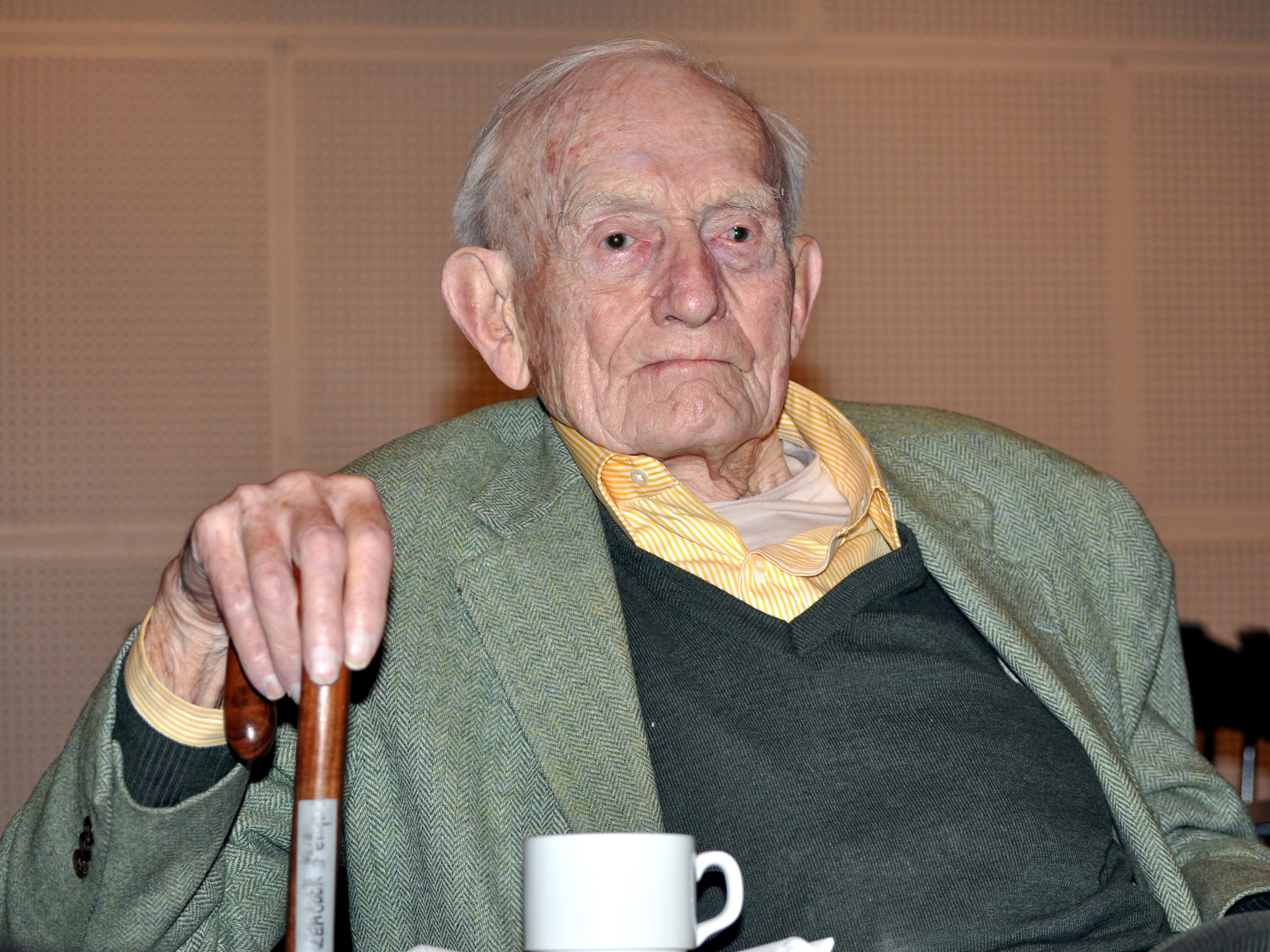
- Leacock in 2009
- Born: 18 July 1921; London, England
- Died: 23 March 2011 (aged 89); Paris, France
- Education: Harvard University
- Occupation: Film director
- Spouses: Eleanor Burke (m. 1941; div. 1962) Marilyn Pedersen West (m. 1963; died 1980)
- Children: 5

Richard Leacock (18 July 1921 – 23 March 2011) was a British-born documentary film director and one of the pioneers of direct cinema and cinéma vérité.

== Early life and career ==
Leacock was born in London on 18 July 1921, the younger brother of film director and producer Philip Leacock. Leacock grew up on his father's banana plantation in the Canary Islands until being sent to boarding schools in England at the age of eight.

He took up photography with a glass plate camera, built a darkroom and developed his pictures, but was not satisfied. At age 11 he was shown a silent film Turk-Sib about the building of the Trans-Siberian Railway. He was stunned, and said to himself: "All I need is a cine-camera and I can make a film that shows you what it is like to be there."

At the age of 14, he wrote, directed, filmed and edited Canary Bananas (10 min. 16 mm, silent), a film about growing bananas, but it did not, in his opinion, give you "the feeling of being there".

He was educated at Dartington Hall School from 1934 to 1938, alongside Robert Flaherty's daughters; David Lack (Life of the Robin) taught biology at the school. After filming Lack's expedition to the Canary and Galapagos Islands (1938–39), Leacock moved to the US and majored in physics at Harvard to master the technology of filmmaking. Meanwhile, he worked as cameraman and assistant editor on other people's films, notably To Hear Your Banjo Play (1941)—Leacock filmed a folk music festival atop a mountain in south Virginia where there was no electricity, using a 35 mm studio camera and 35 mm optical film sound recorder with batteries in a large truck, a rare achievement at that time. He then spent three years as a combat photographer in Burma and China, followed by 14 months as cameraman on Robert Flaherty's Louisiana Story (1946–48).

In the meantime, Leacock had married Eleanor "Happy" Burke in 1941. Daughter of the world-famous literary critic, philosopher, and writer Kenneth Burke, she had studied at Radcliffe College, but graduated from Barnard in New York City. The Leacocks had four children together: Elspeth, Robert, David and Claudia. After ethnographic fieldwork with the Innu (Montagnais-Naskapi) of Labrador, Eleanor Leacock (1922–1987) earned her doctorate in anthropology at Columbia University (1952). Ten years later, after her marriage broke up, she went on to become a pioneering feminist anthropologist.

In 1963, he married Marilyn Pedersen West, a painter, writer, and fashion model, who worked for social causes. They had a daughter, Victoria. In 1970 they separated, and remained separated until her death in 1980.

== Documentaries ==
Many relatively conventional jobs followed, until 1954, when Leacock was asked to make a reportage on a traveling tent theater in Missouri: the first film he had written directed, photographed, and edited himself since Canary Bananas.

This film, Toby and the Tall Corn, went on the American cultural TV program, Omnibus, in prime time and brought him into contact with Robert Drew, an editor at Life magazine in search of a less verbal approach to television reportage. Another new contact, Roger Tilton, wanted to film an evening of people dancing to Dixieland music spontaneously. Leacock filmed Jazz Dance for him, using hand held camera techniques.

Leacock's search for high quality, mobile, synchronous equipment to facilitate observation was ongoing. Along with fellow film maker Robert Drew, he developed the method of separating the wire from the microphones and the cameras. Leacock explains the problem with Louisiana Story and pre-synchronized sound filmmakers:

Like all documentary filmmakers, he [Flaherty] had an identity problem in that period. They couldn't deal with sync sound. It tied them down. Made them rigid… Except for the drilling sequence, which was shot with sound, it was essentially a silent film. And it wasn't till 1960, when we were filming Primary, that we were able to jump into the new world.

Frustrated with the obtrusiveness of the process of synching footage and sound, Leacock knew there had to be a way to separate the two. In 1958, the idea became obvious. "We had to have a mobile quartz camera, and we had to have a mobile quartz tape recorder, and we couldn't have cables connecting them." Leacock took the same design as in an Accutron watch and put it in the camera. This allowed proper synchronisation. They then took their design to RCA who showed interest; and after receiving money from LIFE magazine, Drew and Leacock were able to make the first model and shoot their film Primary. As Leacock pointed out, “nothing has really changed since then, I mean it is a little bit better… basically the same thing." Brian Winston describes Leacock as the father of modern documentary because of this development.

"He was the catalyst for the development of the modern documentary, liberating the camera from the tripod and abandoning the tyranny of perfectly stable, perfectly lit shot—as well as the straitjacket of ‘voice of god’ commentary."

Winston goes on to note that this new mode of film-making essentially dominated over any other style for “a quarter of a century." When most people think of the word “documentary,” they think of the observational mode that Leacock, Drew, and Pennebaker all played such a huge role in creating.

In 1947–1948, Leacock served as cameraman and co-director with John Ferno (Fernhaut) on seven short films in the 'Earth and Its People' series produced by Louis De Rochemont, two in France, and one each in Holland, Switzerland, Italy, Greece, and the Sahara Desert. In the late 1950s, Leacock produced several educational film shorts for the Physical Science Study Committee, a project based at the Massachusetts Institute of Technology (MIT) to improve the teaching of high school physics.

A number of films followed made by Drew, DA Pennebaker, Maysles and their associates, but the U.S. networks were not impressed. In France at the Cinémathèque Française, when Drew and Leacock screened Primary (1960) and On the Pole (1960), Henri Langlois introduced the films as "perhaps the most important documentaries since the brothers Lumiere". After the screening, a monk in robes came up to them and said "You have invented a new form. Now you must invent a new grammar!"

When Drew went to work for ABC-TV, the Leacock-Pennebaker company was formed and produced Happy Mother's Day, Dont Look Back, Monterey Pop (1966), A Stravinsky Portrait and many others ending with the remnants of Jean-Luc Godard's One A.M. – One P.M. (1972).

In 1968, he was invited to join Ed Pincus creating a new, small film school at MIT. Because 16mm filming was becoming so expensive, his group developed Super-8 film sync equipment with modified mass-produced cameras that were much cheaper. Many filmmakers emerged from this program, including Ross McElwee (Sherman's March). Leacock taught at MIT until his retirement in 1989.

In 1989, he moved to Paris, where he met Valerie Lalonde, and they made Les Oeufs a la Coque de Richard Leacock (84 minutes), the first major film shot with a tiny Video-8 Handycam to be broadcast on prime-time television in France. Leacock and Lalonde continued making films without the pressures of TV producers, notably A Musical Adventure in Siberia, in collaboration with his daughter Victoria Leacock, conductor Sarah Caldwell, and filmmaker Vincent Blanchet.

Leacock died on 23 March 2011 at age the age of 89 in Paris. Before his death, he was raising funds for his multi-format memoir The Feeling of Being There: A Filmmaker's Memoir, a bound paper book and DVB (digital video book), published by Semeïon Editions.

To Leacock, the process of film-making is a "process of discovery." He did not film to preach his own ideas and his own presuppositions; he wanted to discover the world around him. To him, any type of staging makes no sense, and in the end, comes across as fake. "Usually, if you wait long enough they end up doing things naturally." Leacock believed that if you wait, people will become comfortable with the camera and start acting like themselves. Cameras, he thought, should be small and unobtrusive, though never hidden. You should shoot in sequence if you can, and without interfering or asking for actions to be repeated. Just like in Crisis and Primary, the action only comes from observation. By simply placing a camera in a room, our eyes can be opened. His main goal was to give viewers the sense of being there.

== Preservation ==
The Academy Film Archive preserved On the Pole, Crisis: Behind a Presidential Commitment, and The Chair by Richard Leacock.

== Selected filmography ==
- 1935 Canary Bananas (8 min.)
- 1941 To Hear Your Banjo Play (20 min., dir. Charles Korvin (Geza Karpathy))
- 1948 Louisiana Story (cameraman)
- 1948 Mount Vernon and The New Frontier (cameraman)
- 1949 Earthquake in Ecuador (director cameraman)
- 1950 Head of the House (writer-director-editor)
- 1952 The Lonely Night (dir. Irving Jacoby, filmed by Leacock)
- 1954 Jazz Dance (20min., cameraman)
- 1954 Toby and the Tall Corn (30 min., writer-director-camera-editor for Omnibus)
- 1956 A Conversation with Marcel Duchamp
- 1957 How the F-100 Got Its Tail (20 min., for Omnibus)
- 1957-9 Frames of Reference, Coulomb's Law, A Magnet Laboratory, Crystals
- 1958 Bernstein in Israel (30 min., Omnibus)
- 1959 Bernstein in Moscow (55 min.)
- 1959 Bull Fight at Malaga (20 min.)
- 1960 Primary (30 min.)
- 1960 Yank! No! (55 min., Close-Up, ABC)
- 1960 Kenya: Land of the White Ghost (Close-Up, ABC)
- 1960 On the Pole (aka, Eddie, 55 min, co-produced and directed, The Living Camera)
- 1961 Adventures on the New Frontier (Close-Up, ABC)
- 1961 The Children Were Watching (dir. Leacock, Close-Up, ABC)
- 1961 Peter and Johnny (55 min., produced by Leacock, The Living Camera)
- 1961 The Chair (55 min., co-produced, directed, and photographed, The Living Camera)
- 1962 Nehru (55 min, co-produced, directed, and shot with Gregory Shuker, The Living Camera)
- 1962 Susan Starr (54 min., filmed by a number of cinematographers, including Leacock, The Living Camera)
- 1963 Crisis (55 min.)
- 1963 Happy Mother's Day (30 min.)
- 1964 Republicans – The New Breed (30 min., with Noel E. Parmentel Jr.)
- 1965 A Stravinsky Portrait (55 min., made with Rolf Liebermann)
- 1965 Geza Anda (30 min., with Rolf Liebermann)
- 1965 Ku Klux Klan – Invisible Empire (50 min., produced and written by David Lowe for CBS Reports)
- 1966 Oh Mein Pa-Pa! (made with Rolf Liebermann)
- 1966 The Anatomy of Cindy Fink (20 min.)
- 1966 Old Age, The Wasted Years (30 min. x 2 for WNET)
- 1966 Monterey Pop (Produced by Leacock Pennebaker, cameraman, directed by D.A. Pennebaker)
- 1968 1-AM – 1-PM (90 min., with Pennebaker and Jean-Luc Godard)
- 1968 French Lunch (cameraman)
- 1968 Hickory Hill (18 min., with George Plimpton)
- 1969 Chiefs (18 min., with Noel E. Parmentel Jr.)
- 1969 Maidstone (cameraman with others)
- 1969 The November Actions (unfinished)
- 1970 Company (60 min., one of three cameramen)
- 1970 Queen of Apollo (20 min., with Elspeth Leacock)
- 1972 Thread (20 min.)
- 1977 Isabella Stewart Gardner (30 min.)
- 1978 Centerbeam (20 min.)
- 1980 Light Coming Through (20 min.)
- 1981 Community of Praise (55 min., with Marisa Silver, for Middletown, PBS)
- 1984 Lulu in Berlin (50 min.)
- 1991 Les Oeufs a la Coque de Richard Leacock (84 min.) video (with Valerie Lalonde)
- 1992 Rehearsal: The Killings of Cariola (35 min.) (with Valerie Lalonde)
- 1992 Les Vacances de Monsieur Leacock (20 min.) (with Valerie Lalonde)
- 1992 Kren: Parking (3 min.) (with Valerie Lalonde)
- 1993 "Gott sei Dank" Ein Besuch bei Helga Feddersen (30 min.)
- 1993 Felix et Josephine (33 min.)
- 1993 Hooray! We're Fifty! 1943–1993 (30 min.)
- 1993 A Celebration of Saint Silas (30 min.) (with Valerie Lalonde)
- 1994 A Hole in the Sea (with Valerie Lalonde)
- 1996 A Musical Adventure in Siberia (with Victoria Leacock)

== Films about Leacock ==
- Ein Film für Bossak und Leacock (1984) – German documentarist Klaus Wildenhahn's homage to Richard Leacock and Jerzy Bossak
- Ricky on Leacock by Jane Weiner, a JDB Films and Striana co-production (work-in-progress)
- How to Smell A Rose: A visit with Ricky Leacock in Normandy (2014) by Les Blank and Gina Leibrecht (US-France, 65 min.)
- The Camera That Changed The World – a 59 minutes film by Mandy Chang
