= Albert and David Maysles =

American documentary filmmakers

- David (left) and Albert Maysles c. 1968
- Born: Albert Maysles; November 26, 1926; David Maysles; January 10, 1931; Boston, Massachusetts, U.S.
- Died: David Maysles; January 3, 1987 (aged 55); Albert Maysles; March 5, 2015 (aged 88); New York City, U.S.
- Other name: Maysles Brothers
- Occupations: Film directors; producers
- Years active: Albert: 1955–2015; David: 1955–1987
- Style: Documentary; Direct Cinema

Albert Maysles (November 26, 1926 – March 5, 2015) and David Maysles (January 10, 1931 – January 3, 1987), collectively known as the Maysles brothers (/ˈmeɪzɛlz/ MAY-zelz), were American documentary filmmakers. They were known for their work in the Direct Cinema style. The brothers' best-known films include Salesman (1969), Gimme Shelter (1970) and Grey Gardens (1975).

== Lives and careers ==
=== Early lives ===
The brothers were born in the Dorchester neighborhood of Boston, living there until the family moved to Brookline, Massachusetts when Albert was 13. Albert and David's parents, both Jewish, were immigrants to the United States; their father, born in Ukraine, was employed as a postal clerk, while their mother, originally from Poland, was a schoolteacher. The family originally settled in Dorchester to be near relatives (the brothers' great-uncle Josef Maysles and his daughter and son-in-law, Becky and Joe Kandib) who had moved there earlier.

Albert originally pursued a career as a psychology professor and researcher. After serving in the U.S. Army Tank Corps during World War II, Albert obtained a BA from Syracuse University and MA in psychology from Boston University. He taught psychology at Boston University for three years, also working as a research assistant at a mental hospital and as head of a research project at Massachusetts General Hospital. As an outgrowth of his research work, he traveled to Russia to photograph a mental hospital, and returned the following year with a camera provided by CBS to film his first documentary, Psychiatry in Russia (1955). Although CBS did not air the film, it was televised on NBC, on the public broadcasting station WGBH-TV in Boston, and on Canadian network television.

David also studied psychology at Boston University, receiving a BA. Also like his brother, David served in the U.S. Army and was stationed in West Germany during the Korean War. In the mid-1950s, he worked as a Hollywood production assistant on the Marilyn Monroe films Bus Stop and The Prince and the Showgirl. David later stated that he grew "disenchanted with conventional filming. The glamour had faded and the filming of take after take had become tedious." By 1957 he had teamed up with Albert to shoot two documentaries behind the Iron Curtain, Russian Close-Up (credited to Albert Maysles alone) and Youth in Poland, the latter of which was broadcast on NBC.

By 1960, the Maysles brothers had joined Drew Associates, the documentary film company founded by photojournalist Robert Drew which also included Richard Leacock and D. A. Pennebaker. Albert would film, while David would handle sound. During this time, the brothers worked on Drew Associates films such as Primary and Adventures on the New Frontier. In 1962, Albert and David left Drew Associates to form their own production company, Maysles Films, Inc.

=== Maysles brothers' collaborative years ===
The Maysles brothers made over 30 films together. They are best known for three documentaries made in the late 1960s and early 1970s: Salesman (1969), Gimme Shelter (1970), and Grey Gardens (1975). Salesman documents the work of a group of door-to-door Bible salesmen in New England and Florida. Deeper down, the film is a dissection of the degenerative and devastating effects of capitalism on small towns and individuals, but more than any political statement the film is about normal people in all their ugliness and truthfulness. Gimme Shelter, a film about The Rolling Stones' 1969 United States tour culminating in the disastrous Altamont Free Concert, unexpectedly captured on film the altercation between Altamont attendee Meredith Hunter and Hells Angels member Alan Passaro that resulted in Hunter's death. Film footage shows Hunter drawing and pointing a revolver just before being stabbed by Passaro, who was later acquitted of Hunter's murder on self-defense grounds after the jury viewed the footage. Grey Gardens depicts the lives of a reclusive upper-class mother and daughter, "Big Edie" and "Little Edie" Beale (who were, respectively, the aunt and cousin of Jacqueline Kennedy Onassis), residing in a derelict mansion in East Hampton, New York. In order to finance these films and others, the Maysleses also made commercials for clients such as IBM, Shell Oil and Merrill Lynch.

The Maysles' films are considered examples of the style known as direct cinema. The brothers would let the story unfold as the camera rolled, rather than planning what exactly they wanted to shoot, in keeping with Albert Maysles' stated approach, "Remember, as a documentarian you are an observer, an author but not a director, a discoverer, not a controller." However, the brothers also received criticism from those who thought that they had actually planned or otherwise influenced scenes. Most notably, Pauline Kael's negative review of the film Gimme Shelter in The New Yorker included a harsh accusation that much of Gimme Shelter and Salesman had been staged and that the main subject of Salesman, Paul Brennan, was not a Bible salesman as the film portrayed, but was actually a roofing-and-siding salesman recruited as a professional actor. The Maysles brothers threatened legal action against The New Yorker after this accusation. They also sent an open letter to The New Yorker refuting Kael's claims; however, because the magazine at the time did not publish letters, the letter did not appear in print until 1996. In the case of Grey Gardens, the brothers were also accused of unfairly exploiting their subjects.

Many of the Maysles' documentaries focus on art, artists and musicians. The Maysles documented The Beatles' first visit to the United States in 1964, and a 1965 conceptual art project by Yoko Ono called "Cut Piece" in which she sat on the stage of Carnegie Hall while audience members cut off her clothing with scissors. Several Maysles films document art projects by Christo and Jeanne-Claude over a three-decade period, from 1974 when Christo's Valley Curtain was nominated for an Academy Award, to 2005 when The Gates (started in 1979 and completed by Albert after David's death) headlined New York's Tribeca Film Festival. Other Maysles subjects include Marlon Brando, Truman Capote, Vladimir Horowitz and Seiji Ozawa.

For many years, the Maysles worked closely with film editor Charlotte Zwerin, who received a directing credit for her work on Gimme Shelter. Zwerin eventually stopped working with the Maysleses because, according to Zwerin, they would not let her produce.

=== Death of David Maysles ===
David Maysles, the younger brother, died of a stroke on January 3, 1987, seven days shy of his 56th birthday, in New York City. Following his death, Albert was involved in litigation with David's widow over the terms of a financial settlement. According to David's daughter Celia Maysles, this resulted in the family developing a "code of silence" regarding David. In 2007, Celia released a documentary about her father, Wild Blue Yonder, which included interviews with Albert.

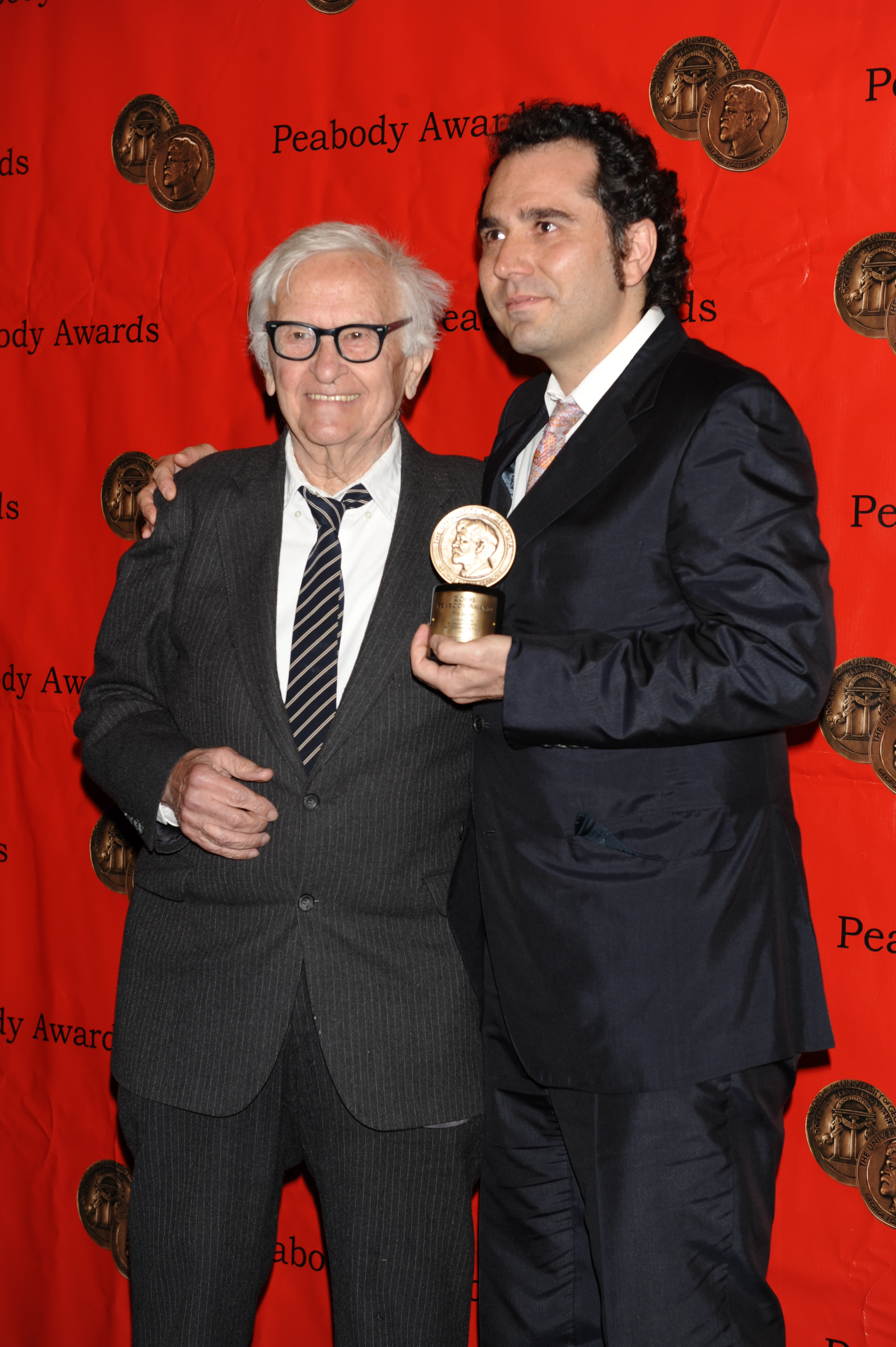
Albert Maysles and Antonio Ferrera at the 68th Annual Peabody Awards in 2009

=== Later life and death of Albert Maysles ===
After his brother's death, Albert Maysles continued to make films. His notable works include LaLee's Kin: The Legacy of Cotton (2001, co-directed with Deborah Dickson and Susan Froemke), which focused on the struggles of a poor African-American family living in the contemporary Mississippi Delta, and was nominated for an Academy Award for Best Documentary Feature; and The Love We Make (2011, co-directed with Bradley Kaplan) which documented Paul McCartney's experiences in New York City following the September 11, 2001 attacks, and premiered on Showtime on September 10, 2011, the eve of the tenth anniversary of the attacks.

Albert continued the series of documentaries begun with David about the public art of Christo and Jeanne-Claude. He also contributed cinematography to Leon Gast's Academy Award-winning documentary When We Were Kings, about the "Rumble in the Jungle" Muhammad Ali – George Foreman heavyweight championship boxing match. In 2005, Albert founded the Maysles Documentary Center, a nonprofit organization dedicated to the exhibition and production of documentary films that inspire dialogue and action, located in Harlem.

Albert died of pancreatic cancer at his home in Manhattan on March 5, 2015, aged 88. His films Iris, about fashion icon Iris Apfel, and In Transit, about the longest train route in the United States, were released posthumously later that year. At the time of his death, Albert had also been working on an autobiographical documentary Handheld and from the Heart.

== Legacy and contribution to documentary cinema ==
By letting real-life action unfold on camera without interference from the crew, the Maysleses pioneered the "fly on the wall" perspective in documentary cinema. This perspective is typical with the genre of documentary known as Direct Cinema which they helped pioneer. This genre is similar to cinéma vérité. They broke tradition with mid-century documentary tropes by eschewing narration, inter-titles and extraneous music tracks. The editing process could be interpreted as their narrative "voice," depending on what footage and sound they chose to use and how the timeline of the story unfolded in the final cut.

Their success from a technical aspect was based in part on separating the camera from the sound recording device (David used a Nagra) by accurately controlling the speed of the camera and the tape recorder, allowing the two devices to be moved independently with respect to each other, an impossibility in commercially available equipment at the time. Long takes with ordinary equipment of the era would invariably lose synchronization.

Albert built his own 16 mm camera with existing parts that could be comfortably balanced on his shoulder, eliminating the need for a tripod, allowing him to shoot fluidly in the moment. He added a brace so he could hold the camera steady during long takes. He installed a mirror near the lens and a ring on the focus-pull and could then set the aperture and focus while the camera rolled, ensuring continuity during a take.

Albert claimed to have a form of attention deficit disorder that made the leisurely pace of editing difficult for him but benefited him while shooting. Stating that his in-the-moment ability to focus let him, "Zero in on a situation as it's happening [with his camera] and pay much closer attention and somehow anticipate what's going to happen the next moment, be ready for it and get it, the way people with normal attention spans are incapable of doing."

The Maysles brothers' films Salesman and Grey Gardens have been preserved in the Library of Congress' National Film Registry as being culturally, historically or aesthetically significant. In May 2002, Ralph Blumenthal in The New York Times referred to Albert as "the dean of documentary film making" and Jean-Luc Godard once called Albert "the best American cameraman". The moving image collection of Albert and David Maysles is held at the Academy Film Archive. The archive has preserved two of the Maysleses' films: Showman, in 2012, and Salesman, in 2018.

== Awards ==
Their only Oscar nomination was for the 1973 short film Christo's Valley Curtain.

Albert was awarded a 2013 National Medal of Arts by President Barack Obama on July 28, 2014. He also won a Primetime Emmy for 1991's Soldiers of Music.

David won a Primetime Emmy for 1985's Vladimir Horowitz: The Last Romantic alongside Albert.

== Filmography ==
=== Filmography of Albert and David Maysles ===
- Youth in Poland (1957)
- Showman (1963) – featuring Joseph E. Levine
- Orson Welles in Spain (1963)
- What's Happening! The Beatles In The U.S.A. (1964) – featuring The Beatles; re-edited and re-released in 1991 as The Beatles: The First U.S. Visit
- IBM: A Self-Portrait (1964)
- Meet Marlon Brando (1965)
- Cut Piece (1965) – featuring Yoko Ono
- Store Front (1965) – featuring Christo and Jeanne-Claude
- With Love from Truman (1966, with Charlotte Zwerin) – featuring Truman Capote
- Salesman (1968, with Charlotte Zwerin)
- Gimme Shelter (1970, with Charlotte Zwerin) – featuring The Rolling Stones
- Christo's Valley Curtain (1974, with Ellen Hovde) – featuring Christo and Jeanne-Claude
- Grey Gardens (1975, with Ellen Hovde, Muffie Meyer)
- "The Burks of Georgia" from Six American Families (1976, with Ellen Hovde, Muffie Meyer)
- Running Fence (1978, with Charlotte Zwerin) – featuring Christo and Jeanne-Claude
- Vladimir Horowitz: The Last Romantic (1985, with Susan Froemke, Deborah Dickson, Pat Jaffe)
- Ozawa (1986, with Susan Froemke, Deborah Dickson)
- Islands (1986, with Charlotte Zwerin) – featuring Christo and Jeanne-Claude
- Christo in Paris (1990, with Deborah Dickson and Susan Froemke) – featuring Christo and Jeanne-Claude

=== Filmography of Albert Maysles ===
- Psychiatry in Russia (1955)
- Russian Close-Up (1957)
- Six in Paris (1965) – as cinematographer for segment "Montparnasse-Levallois" written and directed by Jean-Luc Godard
- Monterey Pop (1968) – as a cinematographer, with D. A. Pennebaker as director
- The Grateful Dead Movie(1977) as cinematographer
- Horowitz Plays Mozart (1987, with Susan Froemke, Charlotte Zwerin)
- Jessye Norman Sings Carmen (1989, with Susan Froemke)
- They Met in Japan (1989, with Susan Froemke)
- Soldiers of Music: Rostropovich Returns to Russia (1991, with Susan Froemke, Peter Gelb and Bob Eisenhardt)
- Abortion: Desperate Choices (1992, with Susan Froemke and Deborah Dickson)
- Baroque Duet (1992, with Susan Froemke, Peter Gelb, Pat Jaffe)
- Accent on the Offbeat (1994, with Susan Froemke, Deborah Dickson)
- Rolling Stones Voodoo Lounge VH1 Special (1994, with Karen Dougherty and Susan Froemke)
- Umbrellas (1995, with Henry Corra, Grahame Weinbren) – featuring Christo and Jeanne-Claude
- Letting Go: A Hospice Journey (1996, with Susan Froemke, Deborah Dickson)
- When We Were Kings (1996) – as a cinematographer, with Leon Gast as director
- Concert of Wills: Making the Getty Center (1997, with Susan Froemke, Bob Eisenhardt)
- LaLee's Kin: The Legacy of Cotton (2000, with Susan Froemke, Deborah Dickson)
- The Beales of Grey Gardens (2006, with Ian Markiewicz) – follow-up to Grey Gardens composed entirely of unused footage shot with David Maysles for the original film
- The Gates (2007, with Antonio Ferrera) – featuring Christo and Jeanne-Claude
- Sally Gross: The Pleasure of Stillness (2007)
- Close Up: Portraits (2008)
- Four Seasons Lodge (2008) – as a cinematographer, with Andrew Jacobs as director
- Rufus Wainwright: Milwaukee At Last (2009)
- Muhammad and Larry (2009) – featuring Muhammad Ali and Larry Holmes
- Hollywood Renegade: The Life of Budd Schulberg (2009) – as a cinematographer, with Benn Schulberg as director
- The Love We Make (2011, with Bradley Kaplan, Ian Markiewicz)
- Iris (2014) – featuring Iris Apfel
- In Transit (2015, with Lynn True, David Usui, Nelson Walker III, and Benjamin Wu)

== In popular culture ==
A 2006 musical based on Grey Gardens premiered at Playwrights Horizons and transferred to Broadway later that same year.

A dramatized version of the Maysles brothers making the Beales documentary appeared in the 2009 HBO film Grey Gardens; actor Arye Gross portrayed Albert and Justin Louis portrayed David.

In 2015 the IFC mockumentary series Documentary Now! paid homage to Grey Gardens with the episode "Sandy Passage" which follows two women named "Big Vivvy" and "Little Vivvy" and takes "An in depth look at the daily lives of two aging socialites and their crumbling estate." The 2016 episode "Globesman", about globe salesmen in the 1960s, is inspired by Salesman.

Episode 3 of the 2024 TV series Feud: Capote vs. The Swans recounts the filming of Truman Capote's 1966 Black and White Ball by the Maysles brothers, which was released as the short film With Love from Truman. Pawel Szajda played Albert and Yuval David played David.
