= Kings of Pastry =

- Kings of Pastry
- Directed by: Chris Hegedus; D. A. Pennebaker
- Produced by: Frazer Pennebaker; Flora Lazar
- Starring: Jacquy Pfeiffer; Sébastien Canonne, MOF; Rachel Beaudry; Philippe Rigollot; Stephane Glacier, MOF; Regis Lazard; Frederique Lazard; Philippe Urraca, MOF
- Music by: Sebastien Giniaux
- Production company: Pennebaker Hegedus Films
- Distributed by: First Run Features
- Release dates: November 13, 2009 (Sheffield); September 15, 2010 (United States)
- Running time: 84 minutes
- Country: United States
- Language: English

Kings of Pastry is a film by D.A. Pennebaker and Chris Hegedus that follows a group of world-class French pastry chefs as they compete for France's most prestigious craftsmen award: Meilleur Ouvrier de France, awarded by former French President Nicolas Sarkozy. The competition, which takes place in Lyon, France, features a diverse range of creative trade professions, from carpentry to jewelry design to pastry making. The honor of wearing the blue, white and red striped collar given to the winners is considered to be the ultimate recognition of excellence in the pastry field. The film focuses primarily on Chef Jacquy Pfeiffer, co-founder of Chicago’s French Pastry School, and one of the sixteen finalist chefs competing — the sixteen finalists were selected from eighty semi-finalists during the semi-final rounds that took place in the months prior to the final competition.

== Plot ==
The film features Jacquy Pfeiffer, Regis Lazard, Philippe Rigollot, and Sébastien Canonne, M.O.F. and begins at the French Pastry School in Chicago, where Pfeiffer prepares for the 2007 competition. While there, the school's co-founder and fellow teacher, Chef Cannone, a previous winner, serves as Pfeiffer's mentor. The theme of this year's competition is marriage, and the competition requires that all competitors create a wedding buffet consisting of a wedding cake, a chocolate sculpture, a sugar sculpture, cream puffs, chocolate candies, breakfast pastries and jam, tea pastries, a restaurant-style dessert plate, and a small sculpture (known as the "bijou") to commemorate the competition. Everything in the buffet, with the exception of the bijou, must be made from scratch and assembled in front of the judges over a three-day period. Keeping in mind that the presentation of his buffet will be judged on par with its taste, Pfeiffer works to develop close to forty recipes that are as visually exquisite as they are delicious.

Once his recipes and training regiment are established, Pfeiffer returns to his childhood home in Alsace where he adjusts his recipes to account for the nuances in French-quality baking ingredients. He is aware that the differences between French and American ingredients can affect the structure of his pastries as well as their taste. For example, French butter tends to have a higher fat and lower water content than American butter, and that slight variation can cause tremendous chemical complications in the baking process. While Pfeiffer is prepared to adjust his recipes, he does not foresee the timing challenges that will require him to rapidly revise his wedding cake and sugar sculpture in time for the fast-approaching competition.

While in France, the film introduces two other competing chefs, Regis Lazard and Philippe Rigollot. Lazard, who worked at Gerard Cayotte's patisserie in Luxembourg, is coached by the pastry chef for French President Nicolas Sarkozy. This is his second time competing. Rigollot is the pastry chef at the renowned Valence restaurant, Maison Pic, which is the only three-star restaurant in France owned by a woman. This is Rigollot's first time competing. Shortly after the 2007 competition, Rigollot opened his own pastry shop in Annecy, Pâtisserie Philippe Rigollot.

Following the preparation period, the film continues on to Lyon for the final competition. Over the course of three grueling days, the sixteen finalists meticulously assemble their buffets under the constant scrutiny of the judges, among whom are world-renowned pastry chefs Jacques Torres, Pascal Niau, and Pierre Herme. Since the contestants are critiqued not only on the taste and artistic quality of their buffet but on their workmanship as well, the judges let no detail of the process go unnoticed. They inspect the chefs' work spaces for signs of messiness, going as far as to examine the chefs' aprons for fingerprints, and their waste-bins for discarded surplus. Their ubiquitous presence does little to ease the contestants' anxiety, and instead, the chefs' mounting stress threatens the stability of their alarmingly delicate sugar sculptures. As the final day of the competition draws to a close, and the contestants race to finish their buffets, the panic among them swells, and more than one chef and delicacy buckle under the pressure.

Philippe Rigollot's sugar sculpture collapses in the kitchen, devastating him and saddening the MOF judges, but he decides to soldier on and earns an MOF through high marks in the other categories. The other two main characters are not selected for the title. Jacquy Pfeiffer plans to take the test again and marries his girlfriend. Regis Lazard's future regarding MOF is not certain.

Pfeiffer opted not to take the exam again in 2011.

== Cast ==
- Jacquy Pfeiffer
- Regis Lazard
- Philippe Rigollot
- Sébastien Canonne

== Production ==
Kings of Pastry is the first visual documentation of the competition, which had never before been captured on film. It was produced by Frazer Pennebaker (The War Room; Al Franken: God Spoke) and Flora Lazar—Lazar graduated from Chicago's French Pastry School in 2007. It was filmed by Chris Hegedus and DA Pennebaker, joined by Nick Doob in Lyon. Permission to film the competition in Lyon was granted to Pennebaker Hegedus Films at the last minute, though the MOF committee stipulated that the filmmakers use only certain sound and lighting equipment. On the final day of the competition, the judges further restricted the camera team to filming from designated three-foot square boxes drawn next to the assembly tables. It was also pitched at Sheffield Doc/Fest's 2008 MeetMarket.

Music for the film was supervised by Alex Toledano and scored in part by Sebastien Giniaux, who also contributed an original arrangement of "La Marseillaise." The soundtrack includes Django Reinhardt's "Keep Cool," "The World is Waiting For The Sunrise," "Menilmontant," and "Bricktop."

== Reception ==
Prior to its release, Kings of Pastry was screened at the Berlin International Film Festival, the Full Frame Documentary Film Festival, the Los Angeles Film Festival, the International Documentary Film Festival Amsterdam, and the Hot Docs Canadian International Documentary Festival, to name a few. It had its theatrical premiere at New York’s Film Forum on September 15, 2010, and was released on DVD in March 2011.

The film received favorable reviews from, among others, the Los Angeles Times, the San Francisco Chronicle, the Washington Post, and New York Magazine. On Rotten Tomatoes the film has an approval rating of 86% based on reviews from 35 critics. On Metacritic the film has a score of 69% based on reviews from 11 critics, indicating "generally favorable" reviews.

== Chef Jacquy Pfeiffer ==
Following the release of Kings of Pastry, Jacquy Pfeiffer has been featured in a number of culinary publications and exhibitions. He appeared on Good Morning America, was named Dessert Professional’s 2011 Pastry Hall of Fame Honoree, and is featured at the Victoria and Albert Museum in London as part of the Power of Making exhibition. Jacquy also coached the winning team at the National Pastry Championship, which will represent the United States in the 2012 World Pastry Championship. He continues to teach at Chicago’s French Pastry School.

== Kings of Pastry and Education ==
In the opening scene of Kings of Pastry, French President Nicolas Sarkozy addresses the newly-honored MOFs at their initiation ceremony. He calls for a blurring of the line that has divided trade professions from their intellectual counterparts, and reminds his audience not to think of "manual knowledge to be less noble than academic knowledge, less capable to create wealth and well being." Indeed, the dedication to their craft demonstrated by the Kings of Pastry chefs exemplifies the sort of lifelong commitment to learning and achievement that a vocational education can bring. These chefs sacrifice tremendous amounts of time and money to their profession in the hopes of achieving a level of knowledge that will forever distinguish them as the best in their field. Their perseverance and hard work reminds the film's audience that an education, of any kind, is never complete, but an evolving and boundless pursuit.

In the United States, vocational education is not often considered to be a suitable, satisfying alternative to a traditional academic curriculum. Notwithstanding the high college drop-out rates that incur from the enormous cost of higher education, and the disengagement many students feel from their academic studies, American high school students are encouraged to enroll in traditional Four Year degree programs. Kings of Pastry documents an alternative to that approach, and captures a group of craftsmen who have found the type of success and gratification in their careers that is typically associated with higher degree professions.

== See also ==
- Meilleur Ouvrier de France
