= Jacquy Pfeiffer =

French master pastry chef and teacher (born 1961)

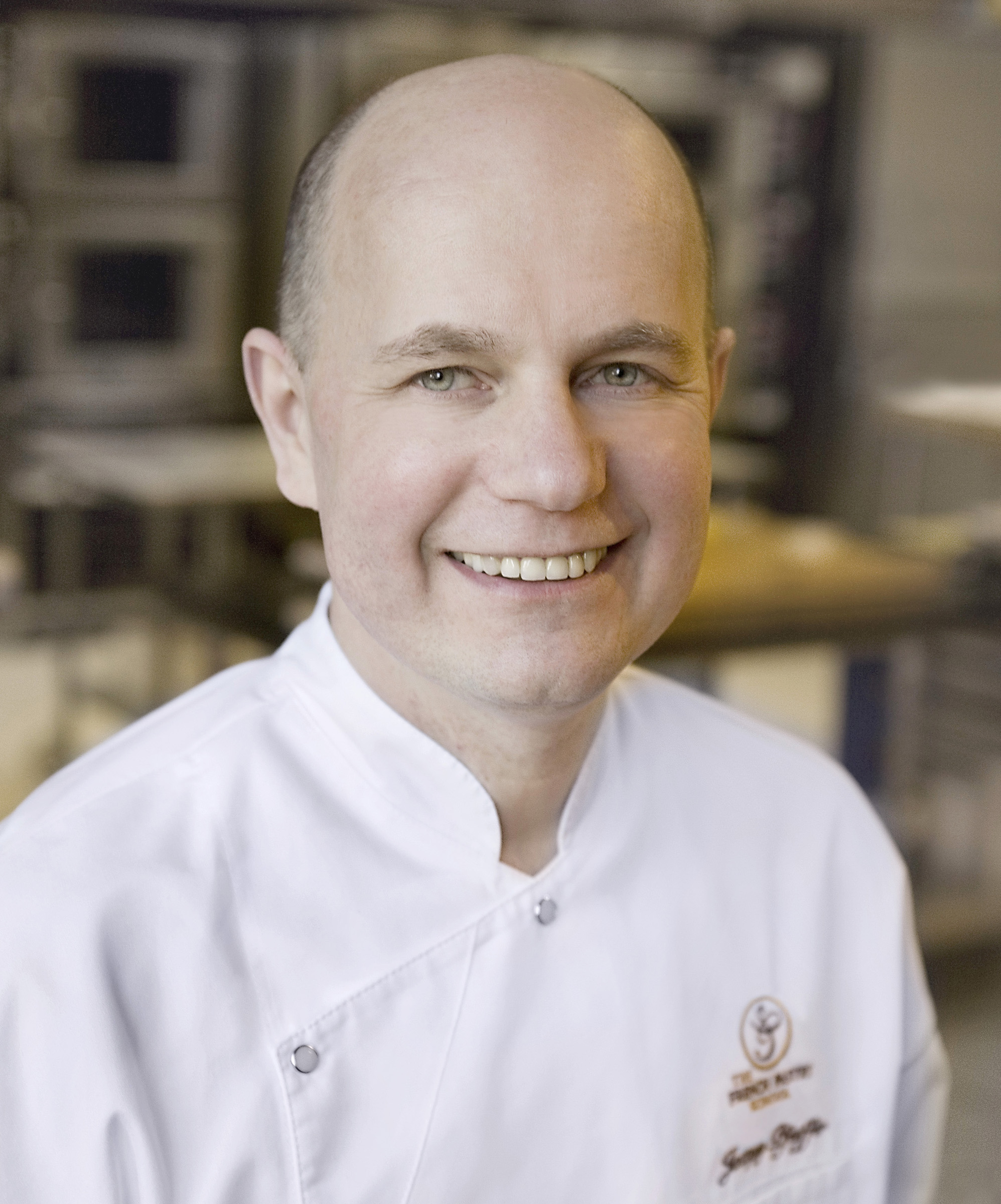
- Born: 1961 (age 64–65); Marlenheim, Alsace, France
- Education: Jean Clauss Pâtisserie; Baldung Grien College
- Culinary career
- Cooking style: French
- Previous restaurants
- Hyatt Regency Hong Kong; Sheraton Hotel, Chicago; Fairmont Hotel, Chicago
- Awardss
- Coupe du Monde de la Pâtisserie, silver medal, 1997; James Beard Foundation Book Award, 2014

Jacquy Pfeiffer (born 1961) is a French master pastry chef and teacher. He co-founded the French Pastry School in Chicago, and co-authored The Art of French Pastry cookbook. He is the primary subject of the 2010 documentary Kings of Pastry.

== Early life and education ==
Pfeiffer was born and raised in the small village of Marlenheim in the Alsace region in France. He learned to bake in his father's bakery. At 15, Pfeiffer became an apprentice at Jean Clauss Pâtisserie in Strasbourg, France. He studied food technology at Baldung Grien College in France, where he was named Best Apprentice and received a degree in pastry science.

== Career ==
=== Personal pastry chef, hotels and restaurants ===
Pfeiffer spent a year as a pastry chef on an oil tanker in the French Navy, and worked in several pastry shops in Alsace, including Chocolaterie Egli and Pâtisserie Naegel. He then served as executive pastry chef for the Sultan of Brunei, who was at the time the richest man in the world; for the Royal Family in Riyadh, Saudi Arabia; and at the Hyatt Regency Hong Kong. He moved to the United States in 1991 and became executive pastry chef at the Sheraton Hotel and then the Fairmont Hotel in Chicago.

In 2010, Pfeiffer received the Bretzel d'Or from the Institute of Arts and Popular Traditions of Alsace, recognizing Alsatians who preserve the arts and traditions of Alsace. He was inducted into the Pastry Hall of Fame by Dessert Professional magazine in 2011. Pfeiffer is a co-owner of Pierre Zimmerman's French bakery La Fournette, which opened in 2012.

=== French Pastry School ===
The French Pastry School was founded in Chicago, Illinois, in 1995 by Pfeiffer and fellow master pastry chef Sébastien Canonne. The vocational secondary school was founded to teach traditional French pastry-making. It is the only school in the United States dedicated entirely to teaching pastry. Pfeiffer serves as dean of student affairs and is also a pastry instructor at the school.

=== Kings of Pastry ===
The 2010 documentary film Kings of Pastry focuses on Pfeiffer as he pursues the coveted Meilleurs Ouvriers de France, the highest artisanal accolade in France, in a competition held once every three or four years in Lyon, France. The film was directed by Chris Hegedus and D.A. Pennebaker. In the San Francisco Chronicle review, Pfeiffer was singled out as "a wonderful lead character… understated, warm and intelligent."

=== The Art of French Pastry ===
Pfeiffer and New York Times food columnist Martha Rose Shulman co-authored the 2013 cookbook The Art of French Pastry, which presents recipes and a detailed look at classic French pastries. It includes anecdotes from Pfeiffer about growing up in a bakery family, and lessons learned in his years as an apprentice.

The book won the 2014 James Beard Foundation Book Award for Best Cookbook in the Baking and Dessert category, and the 2014 International Association of Culinary Professionals Award for Best Cookbook in the Baking category.

== Personal life ==
Pfeiffer lives in France and has one daughter.

== Bibliography ==
- The Art of French Pastry - with Martha Rose Shulman (Alfred A. Knopf, 2013)
