= Sébastien Canonne =

French pastry chef

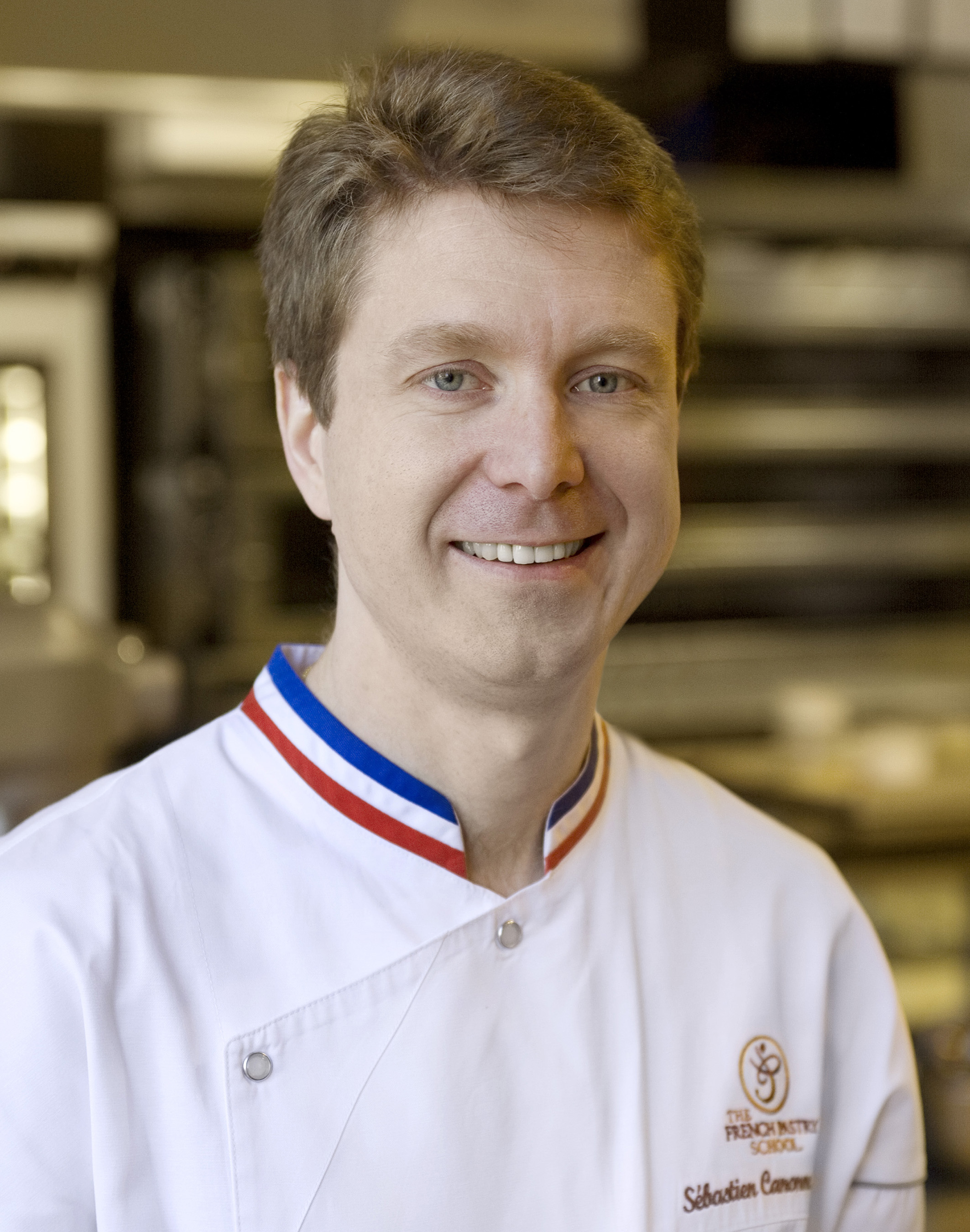
- Sebastien Canonne in 2009
- Born: 1968 (age 57–58); Normandy, France
- Education: Culinary School of Rouen
- Spouse: Vadri Carolina Vasquez Canonne
- Children: 4
- Culinary career
- Cooking style: French
- Previous restaurant(s): Pré Catelan (Paris, France) Côte Saint Jacques (Joigny, France) Beau-Rivage Palace (Geneva, Switzerland) Euler Palace Hotel (Basel, Switzerland) Palais de l'Elysée (Paris) Ritz-Carlton Hotel (Chicago, IL)
- Award(s) won: Meilleur Ouvrier de France, 2004 Order of Academic Palms, 2012 Knight, Order of Legion of Honour, 2015

Sébastien Canonne MOF (born 1968) is a French pastry chef and co-founder of the French Pastry School in Chicago, the Butter Book online platform, and EQUII. In 2004, he earned the title of Meilleur Ouvrier de France. In 2012, he was named a knight by the French government in the Order of Academic Palms, and in 2015, in the National Order of the Legion of Honour.

== Early life and education ==
Canonne was born and raised in Normandy, France. His training began at the Culinary School of Rouen in Normandy when he was 15. He had a culinary apprenticeship at the School of Hospitality and Hotel Management in Rouen, Normandy, followed by a pastry apprenticeship under chef Gaston Lenôtre.

== Career ==
Canonne has worked at a variety of fine-dining restaurants and luxury hotels, including three-star Michelin restaurants; the Pré Catelan in Paris and the Côte Saint Jacques in Burgundy, France; the Beau-Rivage Palace in Geneva; the Euler Palace Hotel in Basel, Switzerland; and the Palais de l'Elysée in Paris for French president François Mitterrand. He moved to the United States in 1991, becoming the executive pastry chef at the Ritz-Carlton Hotel in Chicago.

In 2004, Canonne earned the title of Meilleur Ouvrier de France, the highest distinction for an artisan in France. The title is determined through a contest held once every three to four years. He was the first pastry chef living in the United States to be awarded the honor.

From 1995 to 2020, chefs Sébastien Canonne and fellow master pastry chef Jacquy Pfeiffer founded and operated the French Pastry School in Chicago, Illinois, a vocational secondary school to teach traditional French pastry making. It was the only school in the United States dedicated entirely to the art of pastry.

In 2012, Canonne was knighted in the Order of the Academic Palms, recognizing outstanding merit and contributions in education.

In 2015, Canonne was knighted in the Order of the Legion of Honour, recognizing outstanding merit and contributions to French culture.

In 2020, Cannone launched an online video series of classes called The Butter Book. In 2021, Canonne launched with Bridor, “The Pains Cuisinés”. In 2022, Canonne and several partners co-founded EQUII, a food technology company. The company produces high-protein, low-carbohydrate flour.

=== Film and television appearances ===
Canonne is featured in the 2009 documentary film Kings of Pastry, directed by D.A. Pennebaker and Chris Hegedus, which documented Jacquy Pfeiffer's attempt to earn the title of Meilleur Ouvrier de France. Canonne served as Pfeiffer's coach in the competition.

Canonne was a mentor and judge on season 2 of Top Chef: Just Desserts in 2011.
