= Monterey Pop =

1968 rockumentary directed by D. A. Pennebaker

- Theatrical release poster by Tomi Ungerer
- Directed by: D. A. Pennebaker
- Produced by: John Phillips; Lou Adler
- Starring: The Mamas & the Papas; Canned Heat; Simon & Garfunkel; Hugh Masekela; Jefferson Airplane; Big Brother and the Holding Company; The Animals; The Who; Country Joe and the Fish; Otis Redding; The Jimi Hendrix Experience; Ravi Shankar
- Edited by: Nina Schulman
- Distributed by: Leacock Pennebaker
- Release date: December 26, 1968
- Running time: 79 minutes
- Country: United States
- Language: English

Monterey Pop is a 1968 American concert film by D. A. Pennebaker that documents the Monterey International Pop Festival of 1967. Among Pennebaker's several camera operators were fellow documentarians Richard Leacock and Albert Maysles. The painter Brice Marden has an "assistant camera" credit. Titles for the film were by the illustrator Tomi Ungerer. Featured performers include Big Brother and the Holding Company with Janis Joplin, Jefferson Airplane, Hugh Masekela, Otis Redding, Ravi Shankar, the Mamas & the Papas, the Who (who also besides Hendrix destroyed equipment on stage), and the Jimi Hendrix Experience, whose namesake set his guitar on fire, broke it on the stage, then threw the neck of his guitar in the crowd at the end of "Wild Thing".

In 2018, the film was selected for preservation in the United States National Film Registry by the Library of Congress as being "culturally, historically, or aesthetically significant".

== Performers and songs ==
Songs featured in the film, in order of appearance:

1. Scott McKenzie – "San Francisco (Be Sure to Wear Flowers in Your Hair)"*
2. The Mamas & the Papas – "Creeque Alley"* and "California Dreamin'"
3. Canned Heat – "Rollin' and Tumblin'"
4. Simon & Garfunkel – "The 59th Street Bridge Song (Feelin' Groovy)"
5. Hugh Masekela – "Bajabula Bonke (The Healing Song)"
6. Jefferson Airplane – "High Flying Bird" and "Today"
7. Big Brother and the Holding Company – "Ball and Chain"
8. Eric Burdon & the Animals – "Paint It Black"
9. The Who – "My Generation"
10. Country Joe and the Fish – "Section 43"
11. Otis Redding (backed by Booker T. & the M.G.'s) – "Shake" and "I've Been Loving You Too Long"
12. The Jimi Hendrix Experience – "Wild Thing"
13. The Mamas & the Papas – "Got a Feelin'"
14. Ravi Shankar – "Dhun" ("Dadra and Fast Teental") (mistitled as "Raga Bhimpalasi")

* - Studio version, played over film footage of pre-concert activity.

The order of performances in the film was rearranged from the order of appearance at the festival. Additionally, many artists who appeared at the festival were not included in the original cut of the film.

== Production ==
The American Broadcasting Company put up a $200,000 advance to get a film made about the Monterey Pop Festival for its new ABC Movie of the Week series. However, Monterey Pop never aired on ABC, a decision made by Thomas W. Moore, the head of ABC at the time and, according to Lou Adler, "a very conservative Southern gentleman". "We showed him Jimi Hendrix fornicating with his amp and we said 'What do you think?' " Adler recalls. "And he said 'Keep the money and get out.' He said 'Not on my network.' "

Monterey Pop was shot on 16mm film blown up to 35mm for theatrical release. Director D. A. Pennebaker said he recorded the audio on a professional 8-channel reel-to-reel recorder borrowed from the Beach Boys. The movie's theatrical release used a four-channel soundtrack that included two to three minutes of rudimentary surround sound. Dolby noise reduction was added in 1978 when fresh prints of the film were struck.

After Leacock-Pennebaker, the original production company, was dissolved in 1970, Pennebaker Associates acquired rights to the film.

== Home video ==
When Sony Video released Monterey Pop on videocassette in 1986, Pennebaker created three one-inch tape masters struck from a 16mm negative he had "wet-gated", a process in which sponges remove particles and also place a fast-drying chemical on the film that fills in scratches. In a digital remix for the video, Pennebaker eliminated the surround track of the theatrical release and mixed the center dialog track into the left and right stereo channels. No Dolby was used, although Sony's initial video release inadvertently stated otherwise on the packaging.

In 2002, Monterey Pop was released on DVD as part of a Criterion Collection box set, The Complete Monterey Pop Festival, that also includes Pennebaker's short films Jimi Plays Monterey (1986) and Shake! Otis at Monterey (1986), as well as two hours of outtake performances, including some by bands not seen in the original film. The box set was re-released in 2009 on Blu-ray. For this edition, the soundtracks were remixed in 5.1 Surround Sound by Eddie Kramer.

== Influence ==
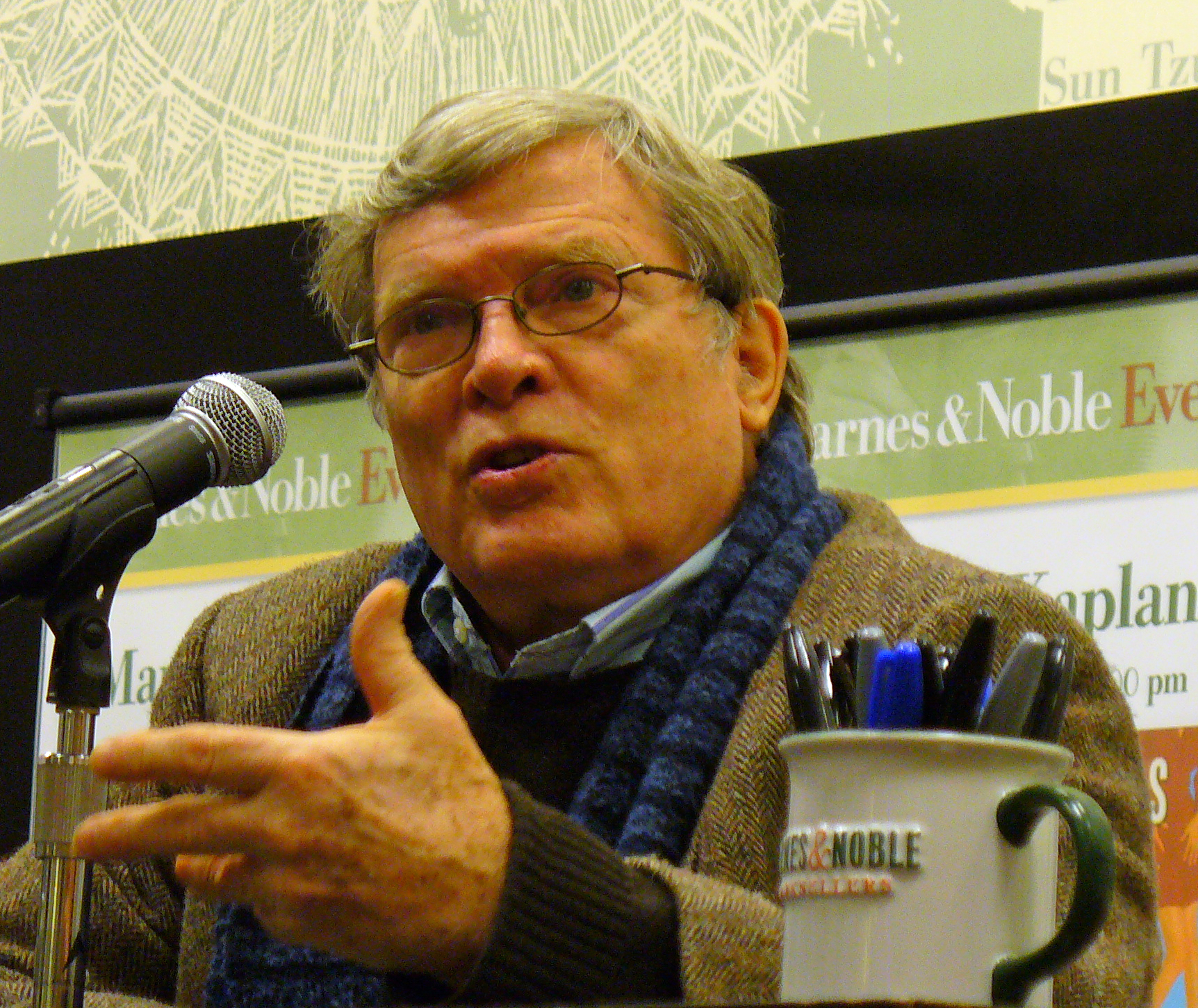
D. A. Pennebaker

Rock critic Robert Christgau considers Monterey Pop the best of the 1960s concert documentaries, saying, "[T]he music and its... celebrants are like a wonderful secret — wonderful because even though everyone knows about it, it still delivers the thrill of discovery. Unveiled in 1968, Pennebaker's vision of the 1967 event was instrumental in convincing potential organizers and participants that music was the healthiest way to crystallize the energy of a counterculture that by then seemed both blessedly inevitable and dangerously embattled."

French New Wave director Jean-Luc Godard was so taken with Jefferson Airplane's performance in Monterey Pop that later in 1968 he set out to make a never-finished film titled One A.M. (for "One American Movie") in collaboration with Pennebaker and Leacock. Godard shot a sequence of the Airplane, (included on the 2004 Fly Jefferson Airplane DVD), playing at high noon on a business day on the roof of a New York hotel across the street from the Leacock-Pennebaker offices, with the tower of Rockefeller Center in the background. Attracted by the extremely high volume of the music, the police arrived and put an end to the shooting.

The screening of Monterey Pop in theaters during the spring and summer of 1969 helped raise the festival to mythic status, rapidly swelled the ranks of would-be festival-goers looking for the next festival, and inspired new entrepreneurs to stage more and more of them around the country.

In 1969, Michael Lang and Artie Kornfeld pitched an idea for a recording studio in Woodstock, New York, to businessmen John P. Roberts and Joel Rosenman. In the documentary Woodstock: Now and Then, Rosenman said the proposal suggested that the studio would encourage occasional rock concerts in the town. Rosenman had watched Monterey Pop the day before meeting with Lang and Kornfeld and, impressed by the film, agreed, with Roberts to bankroll Lang and Kornfeld in an effort that morphed into the 1969 Woodstock Festival.

== See also ==
- Summer of Soul (2021)
- Gimme Shelter (1970)
- Festival (1967)
