= Unlocking the Cage =

- Directed by: Chris Hegedus; D.A. Pennebaker
- Starring: Steven Wise
- Music by: James Lavino
- Production companies: Pennebaker Hegedus Films; HBO Documentary Films
- Distributed by: First Run Features
- Release date: January 25, 2016 (Sundance)
- Running time: 91 minutes
- Country: United States
- Language: English

Unlocking the Cage is a 2016 American documentary film about the work of the Nonhuman Rights Project (NhRP) and lawyer Steven Wise's efforts to grant limited legal personhood rights to chimpanzees, whales, dolphins and elephants. It was directed by D. A. Pennebaker and Chris Hegedus. It was the final film directed by Pennebaker before his death in August 2019.

A. O. Scott of The New York Times praised the film, writing that "D. A. Pennebaker and Chris Hegedus bring their relaxed, acute observational style of filmmaking to bear on a thorny tangle of legal and philosophical questions. Part courtroom drama, part rumination on what separates human beings from other animals, the film is above all a sympathetic portrait of an advocate...it is hard to watch Unlocking the Cage without being somewhat swayed by the arguments — or at least impressed by the sincerity — of Steven Wise."

The Guardian called it an "exemplary animal rights documentary", and that it "presents some fascinating legal and ethical issues". However, Variety's critic, Peter Debruge, accused Wise of "trying to trick a series of New York state judges into granting chimpanzees the same rights as humans" and called his efforts a "publicity stunt."

== See also ==
- Great Ape Project
- Great ape personhood
