= Keep On Rockin' =

Keep On Rockin' may refer to:

- Keep On Rockin' (film), a film of a 1969 Little Richard concert
- Keep On Rockin' (Confederate Railroad album), 1998
- Keep On Rockin' (Brian Cadd album), 1976
- Keep On Rockin' (Slade II album), 1994
- "Keep On Rockin'" (song), by Shonen Knife from Brand New Knife, 1997
