= Chris Hegedus =

American filmmaker (born 1952)

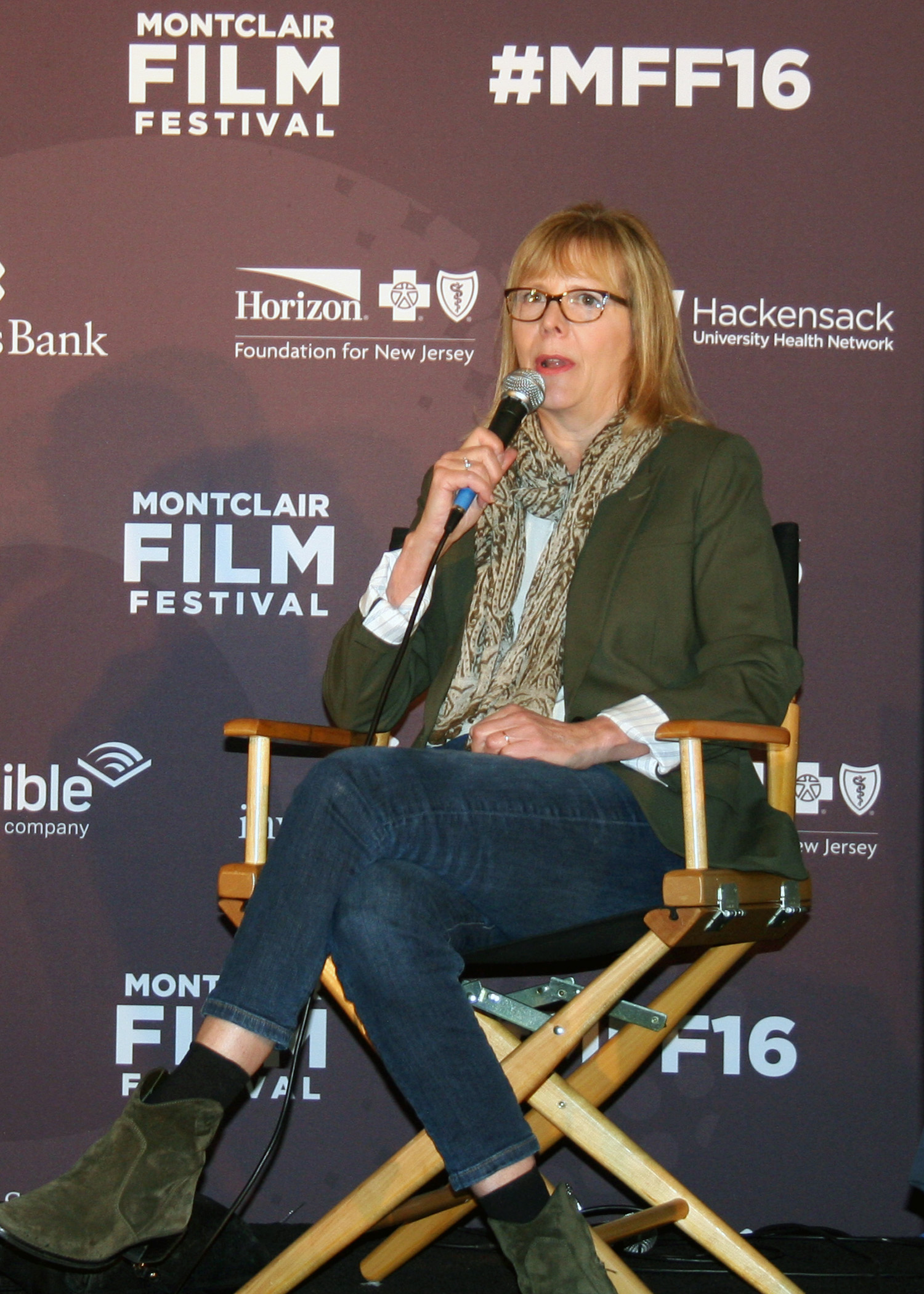
- Hegedus at the Montclair Film Festival 2016
- Born: April 23, 1952 (age 74)
- Occupations: Documentarian; filmmaker
- Years active: 1970s–present
- Spouse: D. A. Pennebaker (m. 1982; died 2019)
- Website: http://www.phfilms.com/

Chris Hegedus (born April 23, 1952) is an American documentary filmmaker. She and her husband, filmmaker D. A. Pennebaker, founded the company Pennebaker Hegedus Films.

Hegedus was nominated for an Academy Award for The War Room, a behind-the-scenes film about President Bill Clinton's 1992 campaign. The film also won the National Board of Review of Motion Pictures prize for Best Documentary. In 2001, she was awarded the Directors Guild of America Award for Outstanding Directorial Achievement for Startup.com. The film is a boom-bust story of two young internet entrepreneurs, co-produced with Jehane Noujaim. Hegedus was also the recipient of CINE's Golden Eagle Award, an Emmy Award, and lifetime achievement awards from several organizations including the International Documentary Association. Her films include the 2010 feature release, Kings of Pastry, about the legendary French pastry competition, the Meilleur Ouvrier de France. In 2011, Hegedus received the Athena Film Festival Award for Exemplary Directing.

== Biography ==
Hegedus studied Fine Arts at the Hartford Art School and graduated in 1973 from Nova Scotia College of Art and Design in photography and experimental film making. Afterward, she moved to Ann Arbor, Michigan, and began shooting films for the University of Michigan Burn Center. In 1975, she moved to a loft in New York City and worked as a cinematographer on independent films including Lizzie Borden's feminist feature, Born in Flames. The following year she began her first collaboration with D. A. Pennebaker as editor of the feature-length film, Town Bloody Hall, a chronicle of the legendary "battle of the sexes" between Norman Mailer, Germaine Greer and other feminists which took place in 1971 at The Town Hall in New York City. The film became the basis for the play The Town Hall Affair by The Wooster Group in 2017.

In 1977, Hegedus, Pennebaker and Pat Powell co-directed and edited The Energy War, a three-part special for PBS that focuses on the historic legislative battle to pass President Jimmy Carter's Energy Bill. The film was cited by the Kennedy School of Government as "one of the best films on government."

From this point on, Hegedus and Pennebaker became partners co-directing, shooting, and editing films – they married in 1982. Together, they directed a host of films including: DeLorean, a profile of automobile entrepreneur John DeLorean as he develops his stainless steel gull-winged car in Northern Ireland; Rockaby, a play that Samuel Beckett wrote specifically for their project with his muse, actress Billie Whitelaw; and Moon Over Broadway, a back-stage view of Carol Burnett's tumultuous return to Broadway, which is cited by The New York Times as a "NYT Critics' Pick."

The company has devoted much of its creative energy towards short and feature-length films about music. Their 1979 short of Randy Newman's song "Baltimore" predates MTV and was one of the templates of the music video format. In 1989, they released the theatrical feature 101 for Warner Music. The film followed the popular English band Depeche Mode and a bus full of fans across the country to their final Rose Bowl concert. Other music-related films include profiles of songwriter Victoria Williams, Branford Marsalis, and Suzanne Vega. Searching For Jimi Hendrix features eleven musical acts, including Los Lobos, Laurie Anderson, Chuck D, and Rosanne Cash interpreting Jimi Hendrix in their own styles.

In 2000, for Miramax Films, Hegedus and Pennebaker directed Only the Strong Survive, a soulful musical tribute with Isaac Hayes, Wilson Pickett, Rufus Thomas, Sam Moore, Mary Wilson of The Supremes, Jerry Butler and others. Down From the Mountain, the 2001 companion concert film to the Coen brothers' release, O Brother, Where Art Thou?, features some of the most talented bluegrass performers of our times, including Ralph Stanley, Emmylou Harris, Alison Krauss, and Gillian Welch.

Together with Nick Doob, Hegedus and Pennebaker filmed several specials for HBO, including Elaine Stritch at Liberty, which won a 2004 Emmy Award for Best Music, Comedy or Variety Show; the comedy Assume the Position with Robert Wuhl; and a segment of Addiction.

For the Sundance Channel, Hegedus filmed Michael Stipe, Bruce Springsteen and others for the 2004 Vote For Change concert, and directed Fox vs. Franken for Sundance's First Amendment series. In 2006, Hegedus theatrically released, Al Franken: God Spoke. Co-directed with Nick Doob, the film follows the political satirist Al Franken's personal transformation from comedy to politics. Following the 2010 completion of Kings of Pastry, Hegedus and Pennebaker co-directed the live YouTube broadcast of the National's May 2010 benefit concert at the Brooklyn Academy of Music.

In 2016 Hegedus directed Unlocking the Cage about animal rights attorney Steven M. Wise and the Nonhuman Rights Project's legal challenge for personhood rights for chimpanzees. The film premiered at the Sundance Film Festival was nominated for an Emmy Award and broadcasts on HBO.

Hegedus has lectured on documentary film in colleges around the country. She taught film at Yale University for eight years and received their Film Studies Award.

== Pennebaker Hegedus Films ==
Chris Hegedus and D. A. Pennebaker co-founded the company Pennebaker Hegedus Films. The company is managed by Frazer Pennebaker who has served as the producer on all of their films since the mid-eighties. In addition to his role as producer, Frazer oversees film distribution and sales for the company.

=== Process and style ===
Hegedus and Pennebaker's films are done in the Direct Cinema style. "Voice-of-God" narration is avoided, as are formal "Talking Head" interviews. A mobile hand-held camera and diegetic sound are also characteristic. Usually Direct Cinema films show us the "back stage", be it of the Rolling Stones as in Gimme Shelter, or JFK in Primary, or Bob Dylan. The stylistic concerns of Hegedus and Pennebaker place them in the legacy of Direct Cinema along with Robert Dew, Richard Leacock, and the Maysles brothers.

== Filmography ==
- The Energy War (1977)
- Town Bloody Hall (1979)
- DeLorean (1981) with John DeLorean
- 101 (1989) with Depeche Mode
- The War Room (1993)
- Woodstock Diary (1994)
- Keine Zeit (1996) with German artist Marius Müller-Westernhagen
- Victoria Williams – Happy Come Home (1997) with singer Victoria Williams
- Moon Over Broadway (1997)
- Bessie (1998)
- Down from the Mountain (2000)
- Startup.com (2001)
- Bessie (1998)
- Only the Strong Survive (2002)
- Elaine Stritch: At Liberty (2004) Emmy-winning portrait of Elaine Stritch
- Al Franken: God Spoke (2006)
- Rock N Roll Music, a film involving Chuck Berry
- Kings of Pastry (2009)
- Unlocking the Cage (2016)
