= Missing Pieces (1991 film) =

- Theatrical release poster.
- Directed by: Leonard B. Stern
- Written by: Leonard B. Stern
- Produced by: Bill Carraro; Aaron Russo
- Starring: Eric Idle; Robert Wuhl; Lauren Hutton; Janice Lynde; James Hong
- Cinematography: Peter Stein
- Edited by: Evan A. Lottman
- Music by: Marvin Hamlisch
- Production companies: Aaron Russo Entertainment; HBO (uncredited)
- Distributed by: The Rank Organisation; Orion Pictures
- Release dates: 1991 (United States); July 17, 1992 (Hungary)
- Running time: 87 minutes
- Country: United Kingdom
- Language: English

Missing Pieces is a 1991 comedy film written and directed by Leonard Stern. Eric Idle plays a former greeting-card writer whose possible inheritance causes him great distress.

== Plot ==
This mystery-comedy is about Eric Idle and Robert Wuhl playing an odd couple, Wendel and Lou. A midget lawyer, a one-handed kingpin, and two brothers—one a crazy photographer and the other a polite antique dealer—are among the supporting cast. Wendel receives a riddle as a legacy from Mr. Hu, one of his several foster parents who has died. Wendel and his best buddy Lou, who plays the cello, quickly come to the conclusion that the puzzle is only a key to unlocking Wendel's actual inheritance and not Hu's heirloom. They encounter several antagonistic personalities while deciphering the puzzle, nearly all of whom want them dead.

== Cast ==
- Eric Idle - Wendel
- Robert Wuhl - Lou Wimpole
- Lauren Hutton - Jennifer
- Bob Gunton - Mr. Gabor
- Richard Belzer - Baldesari
- Bernie Kopell - Dr. Gutman
- Kim Lankford - Sally
- Donald Gibb - Hurrudnik
- Leslie Jordan - Krause
- Louis Zorich - Ochenko
- Don Hewitt - Scarface
- John de Lancie - Paul / Walter Thackary
- James Hong - Chang
- Janice Lynde - Marion
- Mary Fogarty - Mrs. Callahan (as Mary Fogerty)
- Stefan Kalipha - Man (Uncredited)

== Reception ==
The film opened in theatres on July 17, 1992, and was released on VHS on 20 August 20, 1996 by HBO Home Video.

The film was supposed to be released theatrically by Orion Pictures, but the studio went bankrupt before it was released.
