= Great ape personhood =

Extending personhood to nonhuman great apes

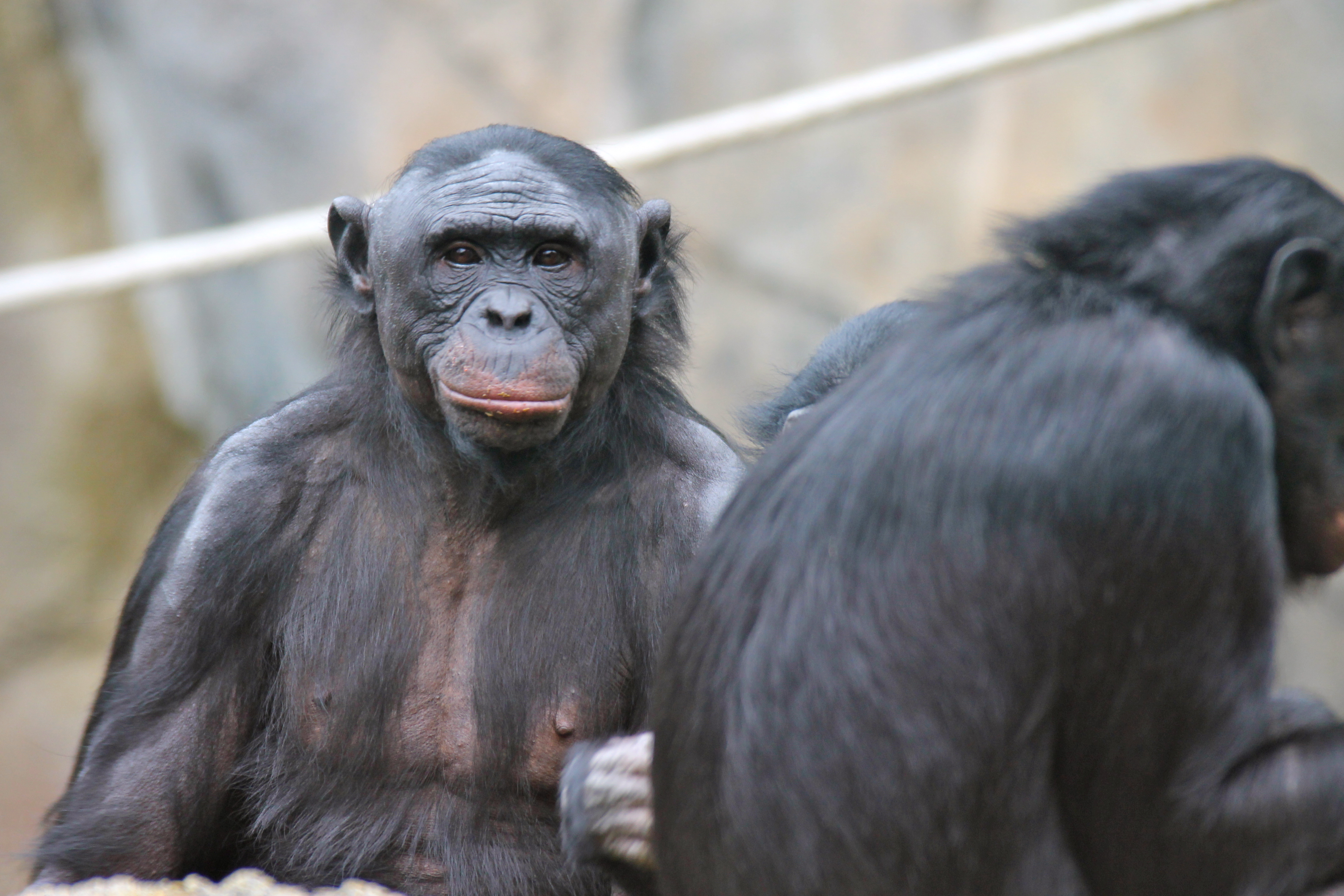
Bonobos, members of the great ape family, Hominidae

Great ape personhood is a movement to extend personhood and some legal protections to the non-human members of the great ape family: bonobos, chimpanzees, gorillas, and orangutans.

Advocates include primatologists Jane Goodall and Dawn Prince-Hughes, evolutionary biologist Richard Dawkins, philosophers Paola Cavalieri and Peter Singer, and legal scholar Steven Wise.

== Background ==
=== Biological studies ===
Longitudinal studies by Goodall revealed the social and family life of chimps to be similar to those of human beings. Goodall describes them as individuals, and claims they relate to her as an individual member of the clan. Laboratory studies of ape language ability revealed other human traits, as did genetics, and eventually three of the great apes were reclassified as hominids.

Other studies, such as one done by Beran and Evans, indicate other qualities that humans share with non-human primates, namely the ability to self-control. In order for chimpanzees to control their impulsivity, they use self-distraction techniques similar to those that are used by children. Great apes also exhibited ability to plan as well as project "oneself into the future", known as "mental time travel". Such complicated tasks require self-awareness, which great apes appear to possess: "the capacity that contribute to the ability to delay gratification, since a self-aware individual may be able to imagine future states of the self".

=== Legal interpretation ===
Depending on the exact wording of any proposed or adopted declaration, personhood for the great apes raises questions concerning protections and obligations under national and international laws including Articles 7–29 of the Universal Declaration of Human Rights; the 1954 Convention Relating to the Status of Stateless Persons and 1961 Convention on the Reduction of Statelessness regarding nationality and citizenship for persons; Provisions 4 and 5 of the Declaration of the Rights of the Child.

== Status ==
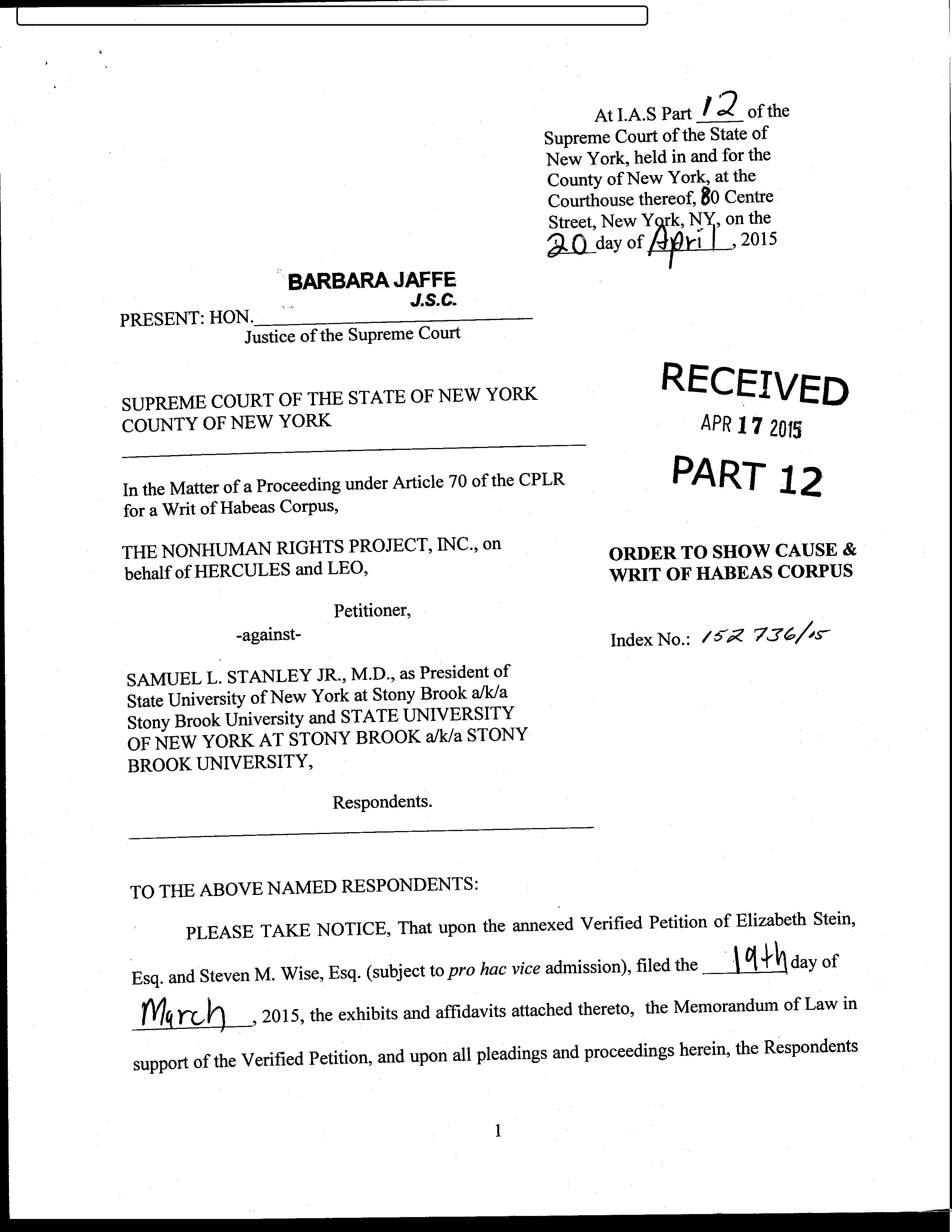
Hercules and Leo habeas corpus Order

=== 1990s ===
In 1992, Switzerland amended its constitution to recognize animals as beings and not things. However, in 1999 the Swiss constitution was completely rewritten, and this distinction was removed.

In 1997, the United Kingdom announced that it would no longer grant licenses for research involving great apes. The then British Home Secretary Jack Straw argued that this decision is a matter of morality, further stating that "the cognitive and behavioural characteristics and qualities of these animals mean it is unethical to treat them as expendable for research".

New Zealand created specific legal protections for five great ape species in 1999. The use of gorillas, chimpanzees and orangutans in research, testing, or teaching is limited to activities intended to benefit the animals or its species. A New Zealand animal protection group later argued the restrictions conferred weak legal rights.

=== 2000s ===
Several European countries including the Netherlands in 2002, Sweden in 2003, Austria in 2004, and Switzerland in 2006 have completely banned the use of great apes in animal testing. Austria is the only country in the world to have banned all live surgery on non-human primates, including lesser apes.

In 2002, Germany guaranteed rights to animals in a constitutional amendment, the first European Union member state to do so.

On February 28, 2007, the parliament of the Balearic Islands, an autonomous community of Spain, passed the world's first legislation that would effectively grant legal personhood rights to all great apes. On June 25, 2008, a parliamentary committee set forth resolutions urging Spain to grant the primates the right to life and liberty. If approved "it will ban harmful experiments on apes and make keeping them for circuses, television commercials, or filming illegal under Spain's penal code."

=== 2010s ===
Under EU Directive 2010/63/EU, the entire European Union banned great ape experimentation in 2013.

Argentina granted basic rights to a captive orangutan in late 2014.

On April 20, 2015, Justice Barbara Jaffe of the New York Supreme Court ordered a writ of habeas corpus to two captive chimpanzees. The next day, the ruling was amended to strike the words "writ of habeas corpus". In July 2015, Justice Jaffe ultimately denied the writ, ruling that legal personhood and habeas corpus are reserved exclusively for humans, meaning animals remain classified as property under the law.

In 2016, an Argentine court ruled that Cecilia, a chimpanzee kept at Mendoza Zoo who spent more than 30 years in captivity, was a non-human legal person with certain fundamental rights. It then ordered her transfer to an animal sanctuary.

== Advocacy ==
The recognition of great ape intelligence, alongside the increasing risk of great ape extinction, has led the animal rights movement to put pressure on countries to recognize apes as having limited rights and being legal "persons".

Well-known advocates include primatologist Jane Goodall, who was appointed a goodwill ambassador for the United Nations to fight the bushmeat trade and end ape extinction; Richard Dawkins, former Professor for the Public Understanding of Science at Oxford University; Peter Singer, professor of philosophy at Princeton University; and attorney and former Harvard professor Steven Wise, founder and president of the Nonhuman Rights Project (NhRP), whose aim is to use U.S. common law on a state-by-state basis to achieve recognition of legal personhood for great apes and other self-aware, autonomous non-human animals.

In 2011, the Institute of Medicine of the United States National Academy of Sciences described experiments on chimpanzees as unnecessary. Their report stated that ongoing acute stress during of the animals does not only produce depression but can also compromise the immune system, thus making results unreliable.

In December 2013, the NhRP filed three lawsuits on behalf of four chimpanzees being held in captivity in New York State, arguing that they should be recognized as legal persons with the fundamental right to bodily liberty (i.e. not to be held in captivity) and that they are entitled to common law writs of habeas corpus and should be immediately freed and moved to sanctuaries. All three petitions for writs of habeas corpus were denied, allowing for the right to appeal. The NhRP appealed the decisions, but the New York appellate courts ultimately rejected the petitions, concluding that chimpanzees are not legal persons because they cannot bear legal duties and societal responsibilities.

Writer and lecturer Thomas Rose argues that granting legal rights to non-humans is not a new concept. He points out that in most of the world, "corporations are recognized as legal persons and are granted many of the same rights humans enjoy, the right to sue, to vote, and to freedom of speech." Dawn Prince-Hughes has written that great apes meet the commonly accepted standards for personhood: "self-awareness; comprehension of past, present, and future; the ability to understand complex rules and their consequences on emotional levels; the ability to choose to risk those consequences, a capacity for empathy, and the ability to think abstractly."

== See also ==
- Animal testing on non-human primates
- Biolinguistics
- Emotion in animals
- Great Ape Project
- International Primate Day
- International trade in primates
- List of notable apes
- Primate cognition
- Speciesism
- The Mentality of Apes
- The Mind of an Ape
- Theory of mind
