= An American Trilogy (book) =

2009 book by Steven M. Wise

An American Trilogy: Death, Slavery, and Dominion on the Banks of the Cape Fear River
- Author: Steven M. Wise
- Language: English
- Genre: Non-fiction
- Publisher: Da Capo Press
- Publication date: March 23, 2009
- Publication place: United States
- Media type: Print (hardcover)
- Pages: 304 (hardcover)
- ISBN: 978-0-306-81475-4
- OCLC: 191926208
- Dewey Decimal: 364.1/870975632 22
- LC Class: SF395.8.N8 W57 2009

An American Trilogy: Death, Slavery, and Dominion on the Banks of the Cape Fear River is a 2009 non-fiction work by Steven M. Wise about the pig industry in North Carolina. Wise is an American legal scholar who specializes in animal protection.

== Contents ==
Wise discovered that the same piece of land in Tar Heel, North Carolina, has over the years seen the decimation of aboriginal tribes by Christian settlers; was the site of a plantation where African-American slaves once worked; and is now the site of factory farms for pigs, and the world's largest slaughterhouse, operated by Smithfield Foods, where 40,000 pigs are killed every day.

In the course of his investigation, Wise interviews former slaughterhouse employees, visits a pork factory, talks to a scientist whose job it is to make pork taste better, and attends the World Pork Expo in Iowa, home of the "Pigcasso" art show and pig races, and, through documenting the life of a fictional pig, criticises the treatment of pigs in pork manufacturing.

Wise writes that the work makes the employees callous, and writes that they are often immigrants who will accept any kind of work, and who are the least likely to report what they see there. The regulations that do exist are not enforced, he writes, because anything that enhances the pigs' lives reduces profit.

== Reviews ==
Barbara Bamberger Scott writes for Curled Up with a Good Book that An American Trilogy is a dramatic and incisive book. She writes that Wise is not asking people to boycott pork. He is looking for advocates for the pig, not converts to veganism.

Publishers Weekly called the book a "muddled manifesto", writing that the author somewhat offensively compares the Indians' "fauna-friendly religion" with the cruel Christian idea of dominion over animals, and before them, over slaves and indigenous Americans. Wise combines what the reviewer writes are genuine outrages with banalities: for example, disapproving of paintings of pigs at the World Pork Expo. The reviewer adds that "Readers who root around a bit will find more cogent discussions of animal-rights issues elsewhere".

Henry Cohen writes that, although not much "is significant in the fact that Native Americans, slaves, and a hog factory all occupied the same site in North Carolina", "[w]hat you will learn from [the book] about hog farming will shock you".

== See also ==
- Intensive pig farming
