= D. A. Pennebaker =

American documentary filmmaker (1925–2019)

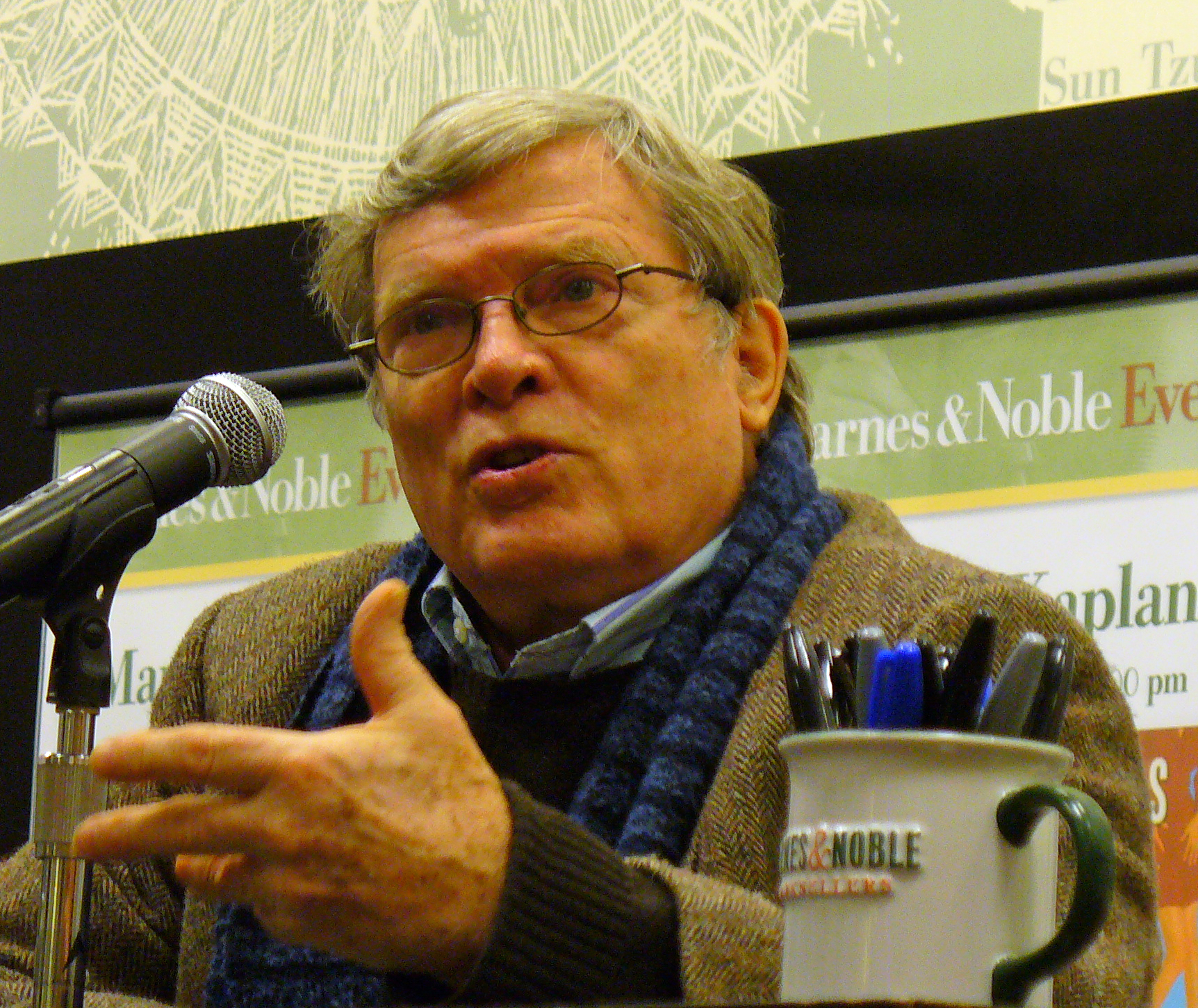
- Pennebaker in New York City in 2007
- Born: Donn Alan Pennebaker; July 15, 1925; Evanston, Illinois, U.S.
- Died: August 1, 2019 (aged 94); Sag Harbor, New York, U.S.
- Education: Yale University
- Occupations: Documentarian, author
- Years active: 1953–2019
- Spouse: Chris Hegedus (m. 1982)
- Website: phfilms.com

Donn Alan Pennebaker (/ˈpɛniːbeɪkər/; July 15, 1925 – August 1, 2019) was an American documentary filmmaker and one of the pioneers of direct cinema. Performing arts and politics were his primary subjects. In 2013, the Academy of Motion Picture Arts and Sciences recognized his body of work with an Academy Honorary Award. The Independent called Pennebaker "arguably the pre-eminent chronicler of Sixties counterculture".

Pennebaker was nominated for an Academy Award for Best Documentary Feature for The War Room (1993). He is also known for directing the documentaries Dont Look Back (1967), Monterey Pop (1968), Original Cast Album: Company (1971), Eat the Document (1972), Ziggy Stardust and the Spiders from Mars (1979), Jimi Plays Monterey (1986), Elaine Stritch: At Liberty (2004), and Kings of Pastry (2009).

== Early life and education ==
Pennebaker (known as "Penny" to his friends) was born in Evanston, Illinois, the son of Lucille Levick (née Deemer) and John Paul Pennebaker, who was a commercial photographer. Pennebaker served in the Navy during World War II. He then studied engineering at Yale and later worked as an engineer, founding Electronics Engineering (the makers of the first computerized airline reservation system) before beginning his film career.

== Career ==
=== 1953–1963 ===
After falling under the influence of experimental filmmaker Francis Thompson, Pennebaker directed his first film, Daybreak Express, in 1953. Set to a classic Duke Ellington recording of the same name, the five-minute short features a shadowy montage of the soon-to-be-demolished Third Avenue elevated subway in New York City. It was released in 1958. According to Pennebaker, Ellington responded favourably to the film.

In 1959, Pennebaker joined the equipment-sharing Filmakers’ Co-op and co-founded Drew Associates with Richard Leacock and former LIFE magazine editor and correspondent Robert Drew. A crucial moment in the development of direct cinema, the collective produced documentary films for clients like ABC News (for their television series, Close-up) and Time-Life Broadcast (for their syndicated television series, Living Camera). Their first major film, Primary (1960), documented John F. Kennedy and Hubert Humphrey's respective campaigns in the 1960 Wisconsin Democratic Primary election. Drew, Leacock and Pennebaker, as well as photographers Albert Maysles, Terrence McCartney Filgate and Bill Knoll, all filmed the campaigning from dawn to midnight over the course of five days. Widely considered to be the first candid and comprehensive look at the day-by-day events of a Presidential race, it was the first film in which the sync sound camera could move freely with characters throughout a breaking story, a major technical achievement that laid the groundwork for modern-day documentary filmmaking. It would later be selected as an historic American film for inclusion in the Library of Congress' National Film Registry in 1990. Inspired by the depiction of Kennedy, Pennebaker received an assignment in 1963 to film a profile on the newly-elected Prime Minister of Canada, Lester B. Pearson, for the Canadian Broadcasting Corporation. Due to the unflattering portrayal of the Prime Minister, the documentary, Mr. Pearson, was not shown until 1969—a year after Pearson had retired from office.

=== 1963–1968 ===
Drew Associates would produce nine more documentaries for Living Camera, including Crisis, which chronicled President Kennedy and Attorney General Robert F. Kennedy's conflict with governor George Wallace over school desegregation. Then in 1963, Pennebaker and Leacock left the organization to form their own production firm, Leacock-Pennebaker, Inc. Pennebaker would direct a number of short films over the course of two years. One of them was a rare recording of jazz vocalist Dave Lambert as he formed a new quintet with singers such as David Lucas and auditioned for RCA. The audition was not successful, and Lambert died suddenly in a car accident shortly thereafter, leaving Pennebaker's film as one of the few visual recordings of the singer, and the only recording of the songs in those rehearsals. The documentary got attention in Europe, and a few weeks later, Bob Dylan's manager Albert Grossman approached Pennebaker about filming Dylan while he was touring in England. The resulting work Dont Look Back (there is no apostrophe in the title) became a landmark in both film and rock history, "evoking the '60s like few other documents", according to film critic Jonathan Rosenbaum. The opening sequence alone (set to Dylan's "Subterranean Homesick Blues" with Dylan standing in an alleyway, dropping cardboard flash cards) became a precursor to modern music videos. It was even used as the theatrical trailer. It would later be included in the Library of Congress' National Film Registry in 1998, and it was later ranked at No. 6 on Time Out's list of the 50 best documentaries of all time.

Pennebaker would also film Dylan's subsequent tour of England in 1966, but while some of this work has been released in different forms (supplying the framework for Martin Scorsese's Dylan documentary No Direction Home and re-edited by Dylan himself in the rarely distributed Eat the Document), Pennebaker's own film of the tour (Something Is Happening) remains unreleased. Nevertheless, the tour itself has become one of the most celebrated events in rock history, and some of the Nagra recordings made for Pennebaker's film were later released on Dylan's own records. All of the Nagra recordings made during the 1966 European appearances were made by Richard Alderson, who, for years, never received recognition. All of his tapes are what comprise the 36-CD box set Bob Dylan: The 1966 Live Recordings, released in 2016. It is Alderson who notes that many of the UK concerts were, in fact, filmed by Howard Alk.

The same year Dont Look Back was released in theaters, Pennebaker worked with author Norman Mailer (who would later appear in 1979's Town Bloody Hall) on the first of many film collaborations. He was also hired to film the Monterey Pop Festival, which is now regarded as an important event in rock history on par with 1969's Woodstock Festival. Pennebaker produced a number of films from the event, capturing breakthrough performances from the Jimi Hendrix Experience, Otis Redding and Janis Joplin that remain seminal documents in rock history. The first of these films, Monterey Pop, was released in 1968 and was later ranked at No. 42 on Time Out's list of the 50 best documentaries of all time. Other performers including Jefferson Airplane and the Who also received major exposure from Pennebaker's work.

=== 1970–1992 ===
Pennebaker continued to film some of the era's most influential rock artists, including John Lennon (whom he first met while filming Dylan in England), Little Richard, Jerry Lee Lewis, and David Bowie during his "farewell" concert in 1973.

In 1970, Pennebaker filmed the cast recording session for Stephen Sondheim and George Furth's musical, Company, shortly after the show opened on Broadway. The film was initially intended to be a television pilot chronicling recording processes of Broadway musicals, but despite wide acclaim the series was scrapped after the original producers left New York to head production at MGM. No other sessions were captured, and Pennebaker's film remains the sole episode. Original Cast Album: Company received renewed attention after being parodied in the IFC television series Documentary Now! in 2019, then being added to The Criterion Channel's streaming service the following year. In August 2021 a physical edition was released, including new commentary by Sondheim and commentary recorded in 2001 by Pennebaker, original director Hal Prince, and Company star Elaine Stritch.

Pennebaker was one of many participants in John Lennon and Yoko Ono's 1971 film Up Your Legs Forever.

He also collaborated with Jean-Luc Godard, who had been impressed by Primary. Their initial plan was to film "whatever we saw happening around us" in a small town in France, but this never came to fruition. In 1968, the two worked on a film that Godard initially conceived as "One AM" (One American Movie) on the subject of anticipated mass struggles in the United States – similar to the uprisings in France that year. When it became clear that Godard's assessment was incorrect, he abandoned the film. Pennebaker eventually finished the project himself and released it several years later as One P.M., meaning "One Perfect Movie" to Pennebaker and "One Pennebaker Movie" to Godard.

Pennebaker's film company was also a notable distributor of foreign films, including Godard's La Chinoise (the American opening of which became the context for One P.M.), but the endeavor was ultimately a short-lived and costly business venture. Then around 1976, Pennebaker met experimental filmmaker turned documentarian Chris Hegedus. The two soon became collaborators and then married in 1982.

In 1977, Pennebaker lent his editing facility to Filipino documentarian Egay Navarro for him to edit the half-hour propaganda film Da Real Makoy, written and directed by cartoonist Nonoy Marcelo, narrated by Philippine President Ferdinand Marcos and produced by his daughter Imee Marcos.

In 1988, Pennebaker, Hegedus and David Dawkins followed Depeche Mode as they toured the U.S. in support of Music for the Masses, the band's commercial breakthrough in America. The resulting film, 101, was released the following year, and prominently features a group of young fans travelling across America as winners of a "be-in-a-Depeche-Mode-movie-contest," which culminates at Depeche Mode's landmark concert at the Rose Bowl in Pasadena. Because of this, the film is widely considered to be the impetus for the "reality" craze that swept MTV in the following years, including The Real World and Road Rules. In various interviews, DVD commentaries and on their own website, both Pennebaker and Hegedus have cited 101 as "their favorite" and "the one that was the most fun to make" out of all their films to date.

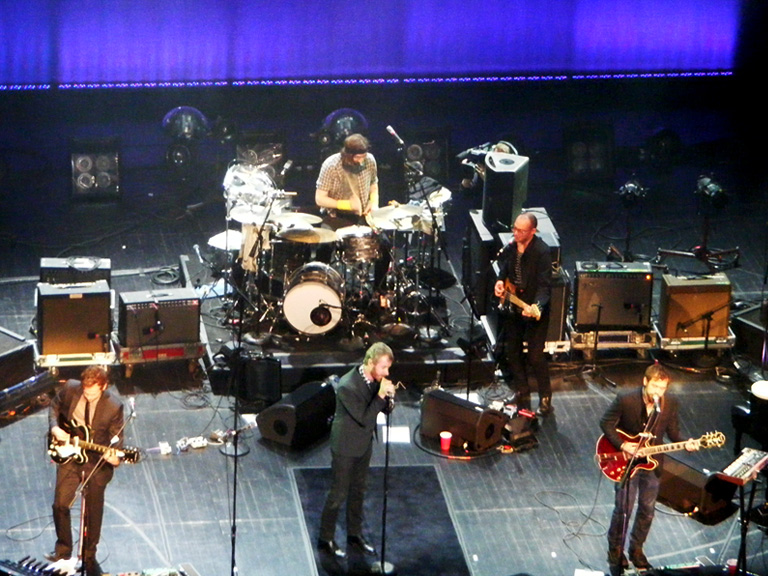
The National at BAM during the webcast directed by Pennebaker and Hegedus

In 1992, during the start of the Democratic primaries, Pennebaker and Hegedus approached campaign officials for Arkansas governor Bill Clinton about filming his presidential run. They were granted limited access to the candidate but allowed to focus on lead strategist James Carville and communications director George Stephanopoulos. The resulting work, The War Room, became one of their most celebrated films, winning the award for Best Documentary from the National Board of Review of Motion Pictures and earning an Academy Award nomination for Best Documentary Feature.

=== Later career ===
Pennebaker and Hegedus continued to produce a large number of documentary films through their company, Pennebaker Hegedus Films, most notably Moon Over Broadway (1998), Down from the Mountain (2001), Startup.com (2001), Elaine Stritch: At Liberty (2004), Al Franken: God Spoke (2006), and Kings of Pastry (2009).

In May 2010, they directed their first live show when they directed a YouTube webcast of the National performing a benefit show at the Brooklyn Academy of Music. That same year Kings of Pastry opened at multiple film festivals, including IDFA, Sheffield Doc/Fest, DOX BOX, the Berlin International Film Festival and Hot Docs, before premiering in New York City. In 2012 he was awarded a Governors Award, introduced by Michael Moore. In 2014 it was reported that Pennebaker, in collaboration with his wife, was working on a documentary focused on the Nonhuman Rights Project and its efforts to have certain animals, such as cetaceans, elephants, and apes, be classified as legal persons.

== Process and style ==
Pennebaker usually shot his films with a hand-held camera and often eschewed voice-over narration and interviews in favor of a "simple" portrayal of events. In a 1971 interview with G. Roy Levin, Pennebaker said that "it's possible to go to a situation and simply film what you see there, what happens there, what goes on, and let everybody decide whether it tells them about any of these things. But you don't have to label them, you don't have to have the narration to instruct you so you can be sure and understand that it's good for you to learn." In that same interview with Levin, Pennebaker went so far as to claim that Dont Look Back is "not a documentary at all by my standards". He repeatedly asserted that he did not make documentaries, but "records of moments", "half soap operas", and "semimusical reality things".

An accomplished engineer, Pennebaker developed one of the first fully portable, synchronized 16mm camera and sound recording systems which revolutionized modern filmmaking.

== Death and legacy ==
Pennebaker died at his home in Sag Harbor, New York, on August 1, 2019.

His aesthetic and technical breakthroughs have also had a major influence on narrative filmmaking, influencing such realist masterworks as Barbara Loden's Wanda, which was filmed and edited by one of Pennebaker's protégés, Nicholas Proferes, and even acclaimed satires such as Tim Robbins' Bob Roberts.

His style has also been spoofed by Weird Al Yankovic and the Emmy-nominated mockumentary series Documentary Now.

== Filmography ==
=== Feature documentaries ===
- Opening in Moscow (1959)
- Primary (1960, National Film Registry Inductee)
- Jane (1962)
- Dont Look Back (1967, filmed 1965; National Film Registry inductee) with Bob Dylan
- Something Is Happening (unreleased, filmed 1966) with Bob Dylan
- Eat the Document (limited release, filmed 1966) with Bob Dylan
- Monterey Pop (1968, filmed 1967; National Film Registry Inductee)
- Sweet Toronto (1971, filmed 1969) with The Plastic Ono Band
- One P.M. (1971)
- Original Cast Album: Company (1971) with Stephen Sondheim
- Ziggy Stardust and the Spiders from Mars (1979, filmed 1973) with David Bowie
- Town Bloody Hall (1979, filmed 1971)
- Elliott Carter at Buffalo (1980)
- Rockaby (1981)
- DeLorean (1981) with John DeLorean
- Dance Black America (1983)
- Jimi Plays Monterey (1986) with Jimi Hendrix
- 101 (1989) with Depeche Mode
- Jerry Lee Lewis: The Story of Rock & Roll (1991)
- Branford Marsalis: The Music Tells You (1992)
- The War Room (1993, Oscar nominee)
- Woodstock Diary (1994)
- Keine Zeit (1996) with German artist Marius Müller-Westernhagen
- Moon Over Broadway (1997)
- Bessie: A Portrait of Bessie Schonberg (1998)
- Down from the Mountain (2000)
- Startup.com (2001, as producer)
- Only the Strong Survive (2002)
- Elaine Stritch: At Liberty (2004, Emmy winner)
- Al Franken: God Spoke (2006, as executive producer)
- The Return of the War Room (2008)

=== Short documentaries ===
- Daybreak Express (1953)
- Baby (1954)
- Breaking It Up at the Museum (1960)
- Anatomy of Cindy Fink (1960)
- You're Nobody Till Somebody Loves You (1964)
- Jingle Bells (1964) with Robert F. Kennedy
- Lambert & Co., or "Audition at RCA" (1964)
- Rainforest (1968)
- Little Richard: Keep on Rockin' (1970)
- Alice Cooper (1970)
- Queen of Apollo (1970)
- Shake! Otis at Monterey (1987) with Otis Redding
- Otis Redding: Live at Monterey (1989)
- Chuck Berry: Rock 'N Roll Music (1992)
- Suzanne Vega (1997)
- Victoria Williams – Happy Come Home (1997)
- Assume the Position with Mr. Wuhl (2006) with Robert Wuhl
- 65 Revisited (2007), one-hour documentary accompanying DVD release of Dont Look Back
- Kings of Pastry (2009)
- Unlocking the Cage (2016)

=== Television ===
- The Energy War (1977, three episodes)

== Awards and honors ==
Year	Association	Category	Project	Result	Ref.
1994	Academy Awards	Best Documentary Feature	The War Room	Nominated	
2013	Academy Awards	Honorary Academy Award		Received	
2004	Primetime Emmy Awards	Outstanding Directing for a Variety Series	Elaine Stritch at Liberty	Nominated	
2018	News and Documentary Emmy Award	Outstanding Social Issue Documentary	Unlocking the Cage	Nominated	
1968	Venice Film Festival	Golden Lion	Monterey Pop	Nominated	
1987	Sundance Film Festival	Grand Jury Prize	Jimi Plays Monterey	Nominated	
2002	Cannes Film Festival	C.I.C.A.E Award	Only the Strong Survive	Nominated	
