= Moon Over Broadway =

- Directed by: Chris Hegedus; D. A. Pennebaker
- Produced by: Wendy Ettinger; Frazer Pennebaker
- Starring: Philip Bosco; Carol Burnett; Ken Ludwig
- Cinematography: Nick Doob; James Desmond; D. A. Pennebaker
- Edited by: Chris Hegedus; D. A. Pennebaker
- Release date: 1997
- Running time: 98 minutes
- Country: United States
- Language: English

Moon Over Broadway is a 1997 documentary film starring Carol Burnett and directed by Chris Hegedus and D. A. Pennebaker.

== Overview ==
The film documents the play Moon Over Buffalo from rehearsal period through the Broadway opening. “Watching it was a little painful. But you see the whole process, and it's really fascinating,” Carol Burnett, speaking at the Sundance Theatre Lab.

== Cast ==
- Philip Bosco as himself
- Carol Burnett as herself
- Jane Connell as herself
- Randy Graff as herself
- Ken Ludwig as himself
- Bob Mackie as himself
- Kate Miller as herself
- Tom Moore as himself (Director)
- Andy Taylor as himself
