= Keep On Rockin' (film) =

1973 film by D. A. Pennebaker

Keep on Rockin'
- Theatrical release poster
- Directed by: D.A. Pennebaker
- Produced by: D.A. Pennebaker
- Starring: Little Richard
- Production company: Geneon (Pioneer)
- Release date: 1973
- Running time: 30 minutes
- Country: United States
- Language: English

Keep on Rockin', aka Little Richard: Keep on Rockin (United States video title) is a film of a 1969 Little Richard concert at the Toronto Rock and Roll Revival festival originally released in 1973. The film is in colour.

== Production ==
The movie was filmed in Toronto, Ontario, Canada. The headliner was John Lennon.

The New York Times explains "The movie is prefaced by some footage of Janis Joplin and Jimi Hendrix".

The film was originally entitled Sweet Toronto, and was supposed to be released in 1972. However, John Lennon demanded payment for footage of the Plastic Ono Band. A reedit of the film, which has the band removed from it, was released in 1973 as Keep on Rockin'. The original footage was eventually released in 1988 as Sweet Toronto. The film is currently "unavailable for sale" according to its listing in the Pennebaker Hegedus Films catalogue. Footage from the film has resurfaced in many knock-off releases such as Little Richard (1981) and Jerry Lee Lewis: The Story of Rock and Roll (1990).

In 1992, the film was released alongside two other live-performance videos by Warner Reprise as part of their Classic Rock series. They advertised by saying: "It's often said about great, frenetic rock music that you can imagine the musicians sweating...[these videos] contain so much sweat pouring from the faces of Little Richard, Chuck Berry and James Brown that you'll want to keep a bucket by the TV set".

== Synopsis ==
Mark Deming of Rovi explains that the film "captures the self-proclaimed "quasar of rock" in fine and unfettered form in this 1969 date at a Toronto festival". He performs a series of his greatest hits.

== Songs ==
1. Blueberry Hill
2. Lucille
3. Good Golly Miss Molly
4. Rip It Up
5. Tutti Frutti
6. Keep A Knockin
7. Hound Dog
8. Jenny, Jenny
9. Long Tall Sally

== Cast ==
- Little Richard - Himself
- Chuck Berry - Himself
- Bo Diddley - Himself
- Jimi Hendrix - Himself
- Janis Joplin - Herself
- Alice Cooper The Band - Themselves
- John Lennon - Himself (scenes deleted)
- Jerry Lee Lewis - Himself
- Yoko Ono - Herself (scenes deleted)

== Critical reception ==
Umbrella Entertainment describes it as a "rare, electrifying Little Richard performance". The Phoenix described it as a "musical extravaganza".

Nora Sayre of The New York Times described it as "nostalgic", as it recreated the 1969 Toronto Rock and Roll Revival, where "the music of the mid-nineteen-fifties captivated an Aquarian audience—just midway in time between Woodstock and Altamont". She adds "this film shows a sensitivity to individuals that some rock movies—such as Woodstock—lacked. [This] work does tend toward prescience—to record what will be important before most of the public is aware of it."

Stephen Mamber contrasted Keep on Rockin' with Monterey Pop, saying the former film is "a clear application of well-defined cinema-verite [or direct cinema] principles and the best way to understand the short-comings of Monterey Pop is to study [Keep on Rockin']. Instead of creating a mosaic structure, Pennebaker [in Keep on Rockin'] limits himself to only four performers, each seen at some length. The independent sequences have a development that only real-time, relatively uninterrupted seems able to provide, and consequently the whole film has a completeness that is inevitably missing from Monterey Pop, with its highly selective editing approach".

== DVD release ==
The film was released on November 12, 2004 by the Geneon Entertainment studio. The only special feature was Interactive Menus. It consisted of one disc. It was released in region 4 on 29/03/2008.
