= Assume the Position with Mr. Wuhl =

- Genre: Documentary film
- Written by: Rebecca Reynolds; Allan Stephan; Robert Wuhl
- Directed by: Nick Doob; Chris Hegedus; D. A. Pennebaker
- Starring: Robert Wuhl
- Theme music composer: Ed Smart
- Composer: Ed Smart
- Country of origin: United States
- Original language: English

Production
- Executive producer: Robert Wuhl
- Producer: Frazer Pennebaker
- Production location: New York University
- Editor: Nick Doob
- Camera setup: Multiple-camera setup
- Running time: 30 minutes
- Production company: HBO Films

Original release
- Network: HBO
- Release: 1 April 2006

Assume the Position with Mr. Wuhl is a 2-part comedy and documentary show on HBO. It stars actor Robert Wuhl. The show looks at the facts and myths of American history in a comedic view.

== Assume the Position ==
The first part of the series debuted in 2006. In this edition Wuhl "Assumes the Position" that History is Pop Culture. He discusses topics such as the real story behind Paul Revere's Midnight Ride and the first sentence of the U.S. Constitution being a "grammatical fuck-up".

== Assume the Position 201 ==
In part two, which debuted in July 2007, Wuhl "Assumes the Position" that History is Based on a True Story. This time he talks about the lack of diversity among the U.S. Presidents, how lousy leaders are as American as apple pie, and his class plays "Real or No Real" determining whether various food icons, such as Chef Boyardee and Aunt Jemima, were real people or not.

== See also ==
- List of programs broadcast by HBO
