= One P.M. =

1972 American Film

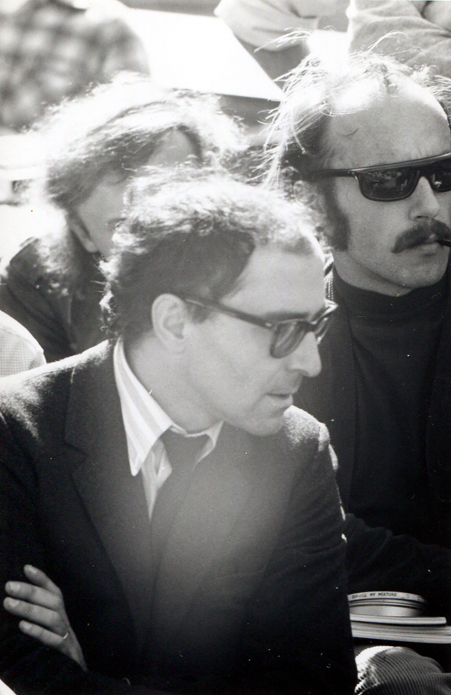
Jean-Luc Godard (left) and Tom Luddy, Berkeley, 1968.

One P.M. (alternately said to stand for One Pennebaker Movie or One Parallel Movie) is a 1972 film by American documentary filmmaker D.A. Pennebaker, who had collaborated with French filmmaker Jean-Luc Godard on the unfinished film project One A.M. and had shared duties as cinematographer with Richard Leacock. Godard filmed One A.M. (One American Movie) in America in 1968.

== External sources ==
- One P.M. at IMDb
