= French Pastry School =

Vocational school in Chicago, Illinois, U.S.

The French Pastry School
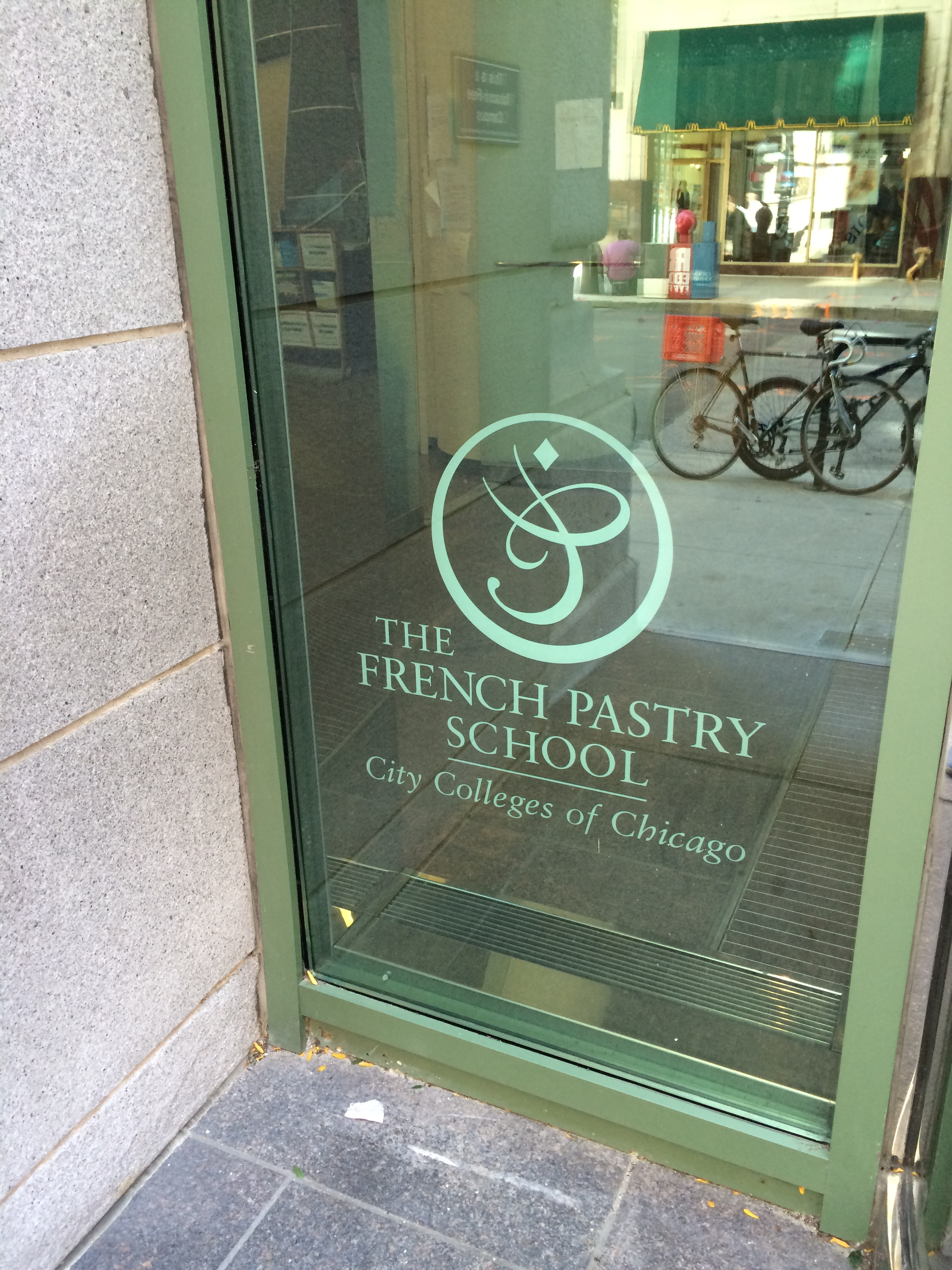
- Other name: FPS
- Type: Private
- Established: 1995
- Faculty: Jacquy Pfeiffer (Dean of Student Affairs); Sébastien Canonne, M.O.F. (Dean of Faculty and Programs)
- Location: 226 W. Jackson Blvd. Chicago, Illinois 60606; 41.8783°N 87.6349°W
- Website: frenchpastryschool.com

The French Pastry School (FPS) is a vocational secondary school located in Chicago, Illinois, in the United States. Its courses cover pastry, baking and confectionery arts. The French Pastry School is a for-profit school, and the only culinary school in the United States dedicated exclusively to teaching pastry.

== History ==
The school was founded in 1995 by master pastry chefs Jacquy Pfeiffer and Sébastien Canonne, M.O.F. Pfeiffer and Canonne met in Chicago in 1992, where they discussed the lack of a serious pastry school in the US. They formed the school in order to teach traditional French pastry making, based on the European master-apprentice model.

At the outset, Pfeiffer and Canonne offered professional continuing education classes out of a small studio on Grand Avenue in Chicago. Enrollment grew, and in 1999, Mayor Richard M. Daley helped the school become affiliated with City Colleges of Chicago and the school moved into a state-of-the-art facility in the City Colleges building at 226 West Jackson Boulevard. The affiliation with City Colleges allowed the school to provide financial aid to students. In 2009, they began an 11,000 square-foot renovation, adding kitchen space in the expansion.

== Courses ==
The French Pastry School offers three certificates: L'Art de la Pâtisserie, a 24-week professional pastry and baking program; L'Art du Gâteau, a 16-week professional cake baking and decorating program; and L'Art de la Boulangerie, a 10-week artisanal bread baking course.

L'Art de la Pâtisserie was launched in 1999 and includes six months of pastry education. In the 24-week accredited program, students are taught classic French pastry methods, with subjects including baking theory and science, food sanitation, breads and breakfast pastries, cakes and tarts, and chocolate and sugar decoration.

In 2010, L'Art du Gâteau was added for students to specialize in the art of cake baking and decorating. The 16-week accredited program focuses on all aspects of creating wedding, celebration and specialty cakes. The students learn cake baking and construction, mini pastries and party favors, gumpaste and pastillage, rolled fondant, sugar and chocolate decorating, airbrushing, mold-making methods, and cake business planning.

L'Art de la Boulangerie debuted in 2011, designed for students wishing to specialize in the art of bread baking. The 10-week program includes fundamentals of French breads, pre-ferments, techniques and applications for levains and starters, specialty whole grains and organic breads, advanced breakfast pastries and viennoiseries, and specialty breads.

The school emphasizes discipline, following instructions precisely, being thorough and detail-oriented, and learning from mistakes by being persistent if a recipe does not work properly at first. Class size is limited to 18, allowing students to work one-on-one with master pastry chefs. The students are given on-going career counseling and placement assistance from the school after they graduate. The school also offers 3-to-5-day, hands-on continuing education courses to both professionals and amateurs.
