= Shake! Otis at Monterey =

1987 film by D. A. Pennebaker

- Directed by: D.A. Pennebaker
- Starring: Otis Redding
- Release date: 1987
- Running time: 19 minutes
- Country: United States
- Language: English

Shake! Otis at Monterey is a 1987 short film directed by D.A. Pennebaker documenting Otis Redding at the 1967 Monterey Pop Festival.

Redding's performance at the festival was cut short due to rain and an impending curfew. The 5 song set list, backed by Booker T. & the M.G.'s, included the songs "Shake", "Respect", "I’ve Been Loving You Too Long (To Stop Now)", the Rolling Stones’ "(I Can't Get No) Satisfaction", and "Try a Little Tenderness".
