= Al Franken: God Spoke =

- Theatrical release poster
- Directed by: Nick Doob; Chris Hegedus
- Produced by: Rebecca Marshall; Frazer Pennebaker
- Starring: Al Franken
- Music by: Ed Smart
- Distributed by: Balcony Releasing
- Release date: September 13, 2006
- Running time: 90 minutes
- Country: United States
- Language: English

Al Franken: God Spoke is a 2006 documentary film starring political commentator and future United States Senator Al Franken. The film was made by the same producers of The War Room. It was released in April 2006 at the Tribeca Film Festival and was released in the US in September 2006 starting in New York City.

== Plot ==
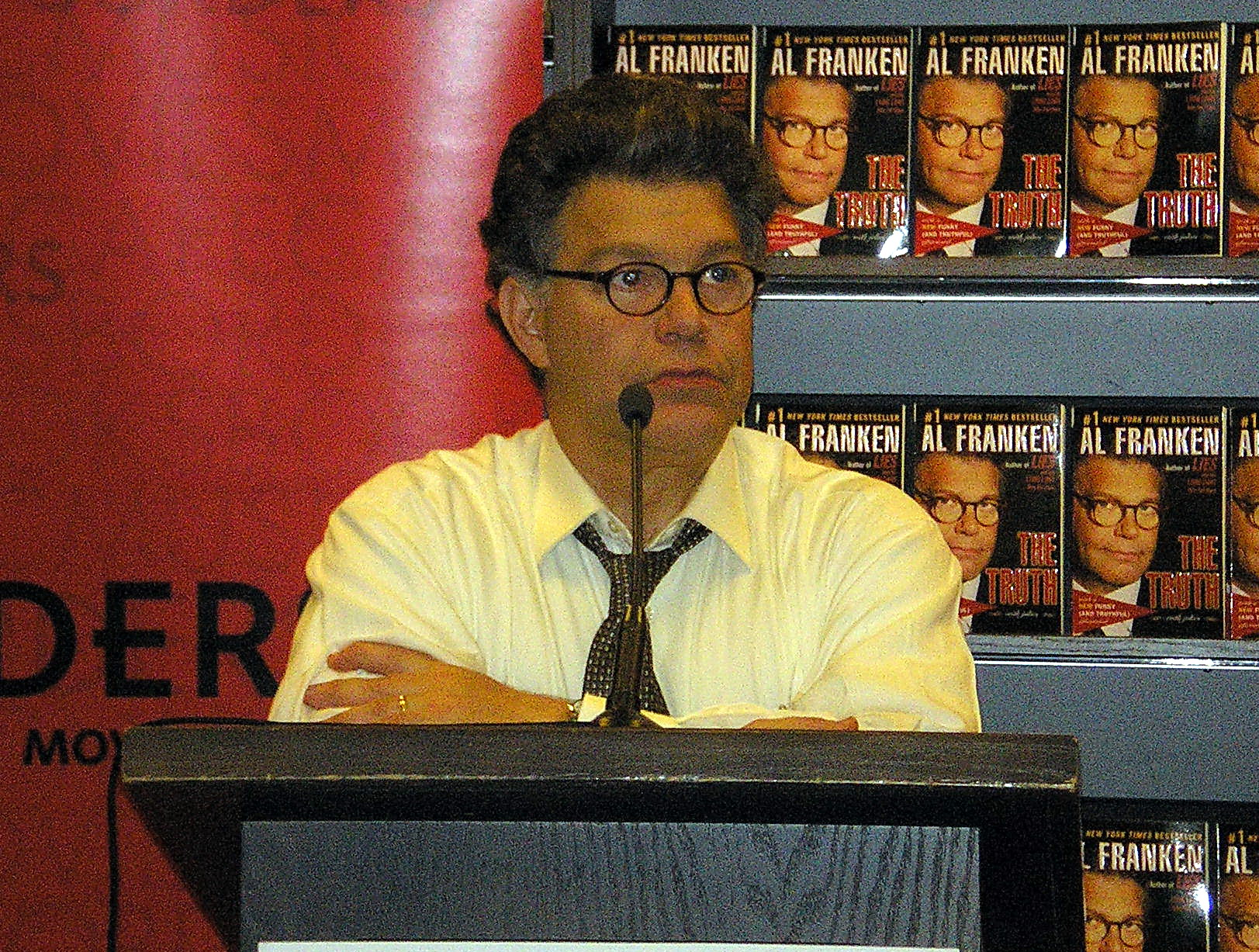
Franken on book tour, promoting his 2005 release, The Truth (With Jokes).

In Al Franken: God Spoke, the makers of The War Room capture the emergence of Al Franken as a political commentator. The film is shot over the course of two years and follows Franken from his highly publicized feud with Fox News Channel anchor Bill O'Reilly to his fierce campaign against President George W. Bush during the 2004 election.

The film goes to several different places to catch Franken in real settings. The film crew went with him to Iraq during a USO tour in that country, followed him during his airing on Air America Radio, and during his various campaigns. The film crew is given behind the scenes access as the noted liberal goes up against his rivals. The film features many of those allied with Franken and many of his opponents. Some of his allies in this film include Michael Moore, Al Gore, and Robert F. Kennedy, Jr. Some of his featured opponents include Ann Coulter and Bill O'Reilly.

== Cast ==
- Al Franken
- Neal Boortz
- Ann Coulter
- Sean Hannity
- Michael Medved

== Reception ==
Variety called the film a "Smoothly paced, well-crafted pic" but thought it "more celebratory than revelatory", suggesting that as a documentary it reflected bias (pointing out, for example, that it showed Franken "gloating" about George Bush's inevitable defeat on the eve of the 2004 election but not his reaction the following morning after Bush's victory). A.O. Scott in The New York Times felt it unlikely to convert anyone not already an admirer of Franken and his politics: "the film is more likely to attract or repel viewers according to the sides they’ve already chosen". J.R. Jones wrote in The Chicago Reader, "I love Franken and wish there were more funny liberals in the chattering class, but his crushing sarcasm wouldn’t exactly elevate the national debate." Ed Gonzalez in Slant Magazine was cooler still: "Al Franken: God Spoke doesn’t work as a film... Franken is, quite simply, too nice".
