= The War Room =

- Theatrical release poster
- Directed by: Chris Hegedus; D. A. Pennebaker
- Produced by: R. J. Cutler; Wendy Ettinger; Frazer Pennebaker
- Cinematography: D. A. Pennebaker; Nick Doob
- Edited by: Chris Hegedus; D. A. Pennebaker; Erez Laufer
- Production companies: Pennebaker Associates; McEttinger Films; Cyclone Films
- Distributed by: October Films
- Release date: December 5, 1993
- Running time: 96 minutes
- Country: United States
- Language: English
- Box office: $901,668

The War Room is a 1993 American documentary film about Bill Clinton's campaign for President of the United States during the 1992 United States presidential election. Directed by Chris Hegedus and D. A. Pennebaker, the film was released on December 5, 1993. It was eventually nominated for the Best Documentary Feature Academy Award.

== Synopsis ==
The film follows James Carville and George Stephanopoulos, at first during the New Hampshire primary, and then mostly in Little Rock, Arkansas, at the Clinton campaign headquarters. Several key events of the 1992 election cycle and their repercussions within the Clinton campaign are chronicled in the documentary. These include: the Gennifer Flowers scandal, the New Hampshire Democratic primary, Ross Perot's campaign as an Independent, the Democratic National Convention, the Clinton campaign's attack on George H. W. Bush's "Read my lips: no new taxes" statement from 1988, the presidential debates, and the night of the general election.

Much of the film focuses on the interaction between politics and the media and the attempts by the Clinton and Bush campaigns to spin public perception of events and news stories.

=== People ===
The primary figures in the film are:

- Bill Clinton, 1992 Democratic Party presidential candidate and 42nd Governor of Arkansas
- James Carville, Clinton's lead strategist
- George Stephanopoulos, Clinton's communications director

Though Carville and Stephanopoulos are the film's main figures, many other prominent figures in the campaign make appearances, including Paul Begala, Dee Dee Myers, Mandy Grunwald, Bob Boorstin, Stan Greenberg, Mickey Kantor, Harold Ickes, and Bush's deputy campaign manager Mary Matalin, who was in a relationship with Carville during the campaign (they married in 1993). Clinton campaign manager David Wilhelm was extended an invitation to participate, but declined. Additionally, Rahm Emanuel, the future White House Chief of Staff to President Barack Obama and Mayor of Chicago, can be seen in some scenes as a finance director for the Clinton campaign. Also featured are Clinton's general election rivals George H. W. Bush and Ross Perot, and his Democratic primary rivals Paul Tsongas and Jerry Brown.

== Production ==
Shortly before the 1992 Democratic National Convention, novice producers R.J. Cutler and Wendy Ettinger approached filmmakers D. A. Pennebaker and Chris Hegedus about making a documentary about the then-ongoing 1992 U.S. presidential election. Pennebaker and Hegedus expressed interest, provided the producers could get them permission to film what they would need to film, so Cutler and Ettinger contacted the Bush, Perot, and Clinton campaigns. Only the Clinton campaign was open to giving the filmmakers any access, and this was limited primarily to Carville and Stephanopoulos and events that transpired within the so-called "war room" at the campaign's national headquarters in Little Rock, Arkansas, so the scope of the film narrowed from encompassing the entire election to mostly centering around one room. Events in the election cycle that occurred before the Democratic National Convention were covered in the completed documentary through montages of newspaper headlines, the use of clips from TV news programs, and, according to Hegedus, unused footage from Kevin Rafferty's Feed, a documentary about the 1992 New Hampshire primary.

Over a span of four months spent filming, Pennebaker and Hegedus shot about 35 hours of film.

== 2008 Democratic primary controversy ==
In late April 2008, a clip from the film was posted on YouTube that purported to show former Clinton administration official (and supporter of then-presidential candidate Hillary Clinton) Mickey Kantor saying to Carville and Stephanopoulos, "Look at Indiana, wait, wait – look at Indiana. 42-40. It doesn’t matter if we win. Those people are shit. Excuse me." Another erroneous interpretation of the clip alleged that Kantor said, "How would you like to be a worthless white nigger?".

On May 2, 2008, Kantor claimed that the footage had been doctored, and shortly thereafter D.A. Pennebaker claimed that Kantor had actually said "Those people must be shitting in the White House." The doctored footage and false allegations against Kantor were discussed in the Return of the War Room, a 2008 sequel made by Pennebaker and Hegedus.

== Reception and legacy ==
External videos
- Interviews with D.A. Pennebaker, Chris Hegedus, James Carville, and George Stephanopolous at the Washington, D.C. premiere of The War Room, November 12, 1993, C-SPAN

=== Box office ===
As it was screened at only a few locations, the film grossed $901,668 at the box office.

=== Critical reception ===
The film received near universal acclaim from critics. On Rotten Tomatoes, it has a 96% "fresh" rating based on 24 reviews, with an average rating of 8.11/10. The website's consensus reads, "Eye-opening in its access to an array of colorful campaign operatives, The War Room is a valuable time capsule and a riveting study in the art of politicking."

=== Accolades ===
- 66th Academy Awards

Nominated for Best Documentary Feature (1994)

- National Board of Review of Motion Pictures

Won Special Recognition in Filmmaking (1996)
Won Award for Best Documentary (1993)

=== Home media ===
The film was released as a special edition DVD and Blu-ray by the Criterion Collection on March 20, 2012. It had previously been released on DVD in 1999 by Trimark Home Video as a bare bones package and in 2004 by Focus Features and Universal Studios as a special edition DVD.

=== Influence ===
According to an article in the Brisbane Times, George Clooney, Ryan Gosling, and the cast of The Ides of March watched The War Room to "get their bearings" on their characters and life on the campaign trail.

The documentary was spoofed by IFC series Documentary Now!, in the second-season episode "The Bunker".

== See also ==
- Primary (1960) – a pioneering film about the electoral process in the 1960 U.S. presidential election that was edited by D. A. Pennebaker
- Cinema verite
