= Robert Wuhl =

American actor, comedian and writer (born 1951)

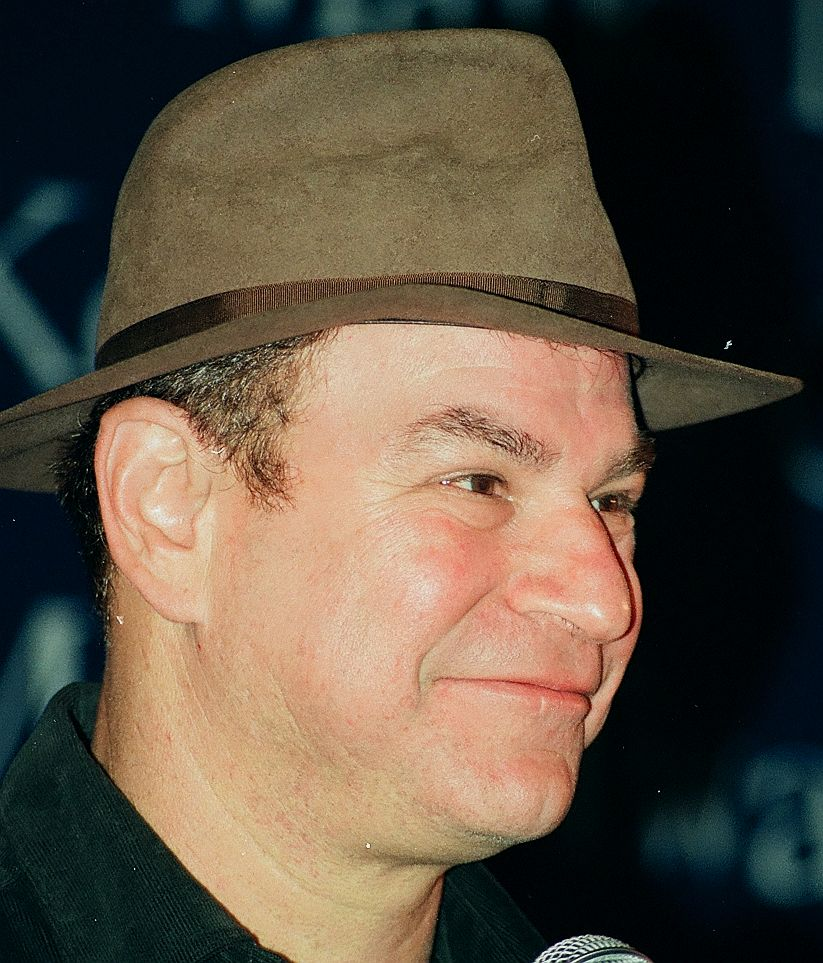
- Wuhl in 1998
- Born: October 9, 1951 (age 74); Union, New Jersey, U.S.
- Education: Union High School
- Alma mater: University of Houston
- Occupations: Actor; comedian; writer
- Years active: 1980–present

Robert Wuhl (born October 9, 1951) is an American actor, comedian, and writer. He is best known as the creator and star of the television comedy series Arliss (1996–2002) and for his portrayal of newspaper reporter Alexander Knox in Tim Burton's Batman (1989) and Larry in Bull Durham (1988).

== Early life ==
Wuhl was born in Union, New Jersey, to a Jewish family. His father worked as a produce distributor. After attending Union High School, Wuhl headed to the University of Houston, where he was active in the drama department and the Epsilon-Omicron chapter of Tau Kappa Epsilon fraternity. Wuhl was awarded a Distinguished Alumni Award from his alma mater in April 2012.

== Career ==
Wuhl's first role in movies was a starring role in the 1980 comedy The Hollywood Knights along with other fledgling actors Tony Danza, Michelle Pfeiffer, and Fran Drescher, followed by a small role in the film Flashdance (1983). Wuhl had larger roles in films including Good Morning, Vietnam (1987) with Robin Williams, Bull Durham (1988) with Kevin Costner, Tim Burton's 1989 Batman (as reporter Alexander Knox) with Michael Keaton, Blaze (1989) with Paul Newman, Missing Pieces (1991) with Eric Idle, Mistress (1992) with Robert De Niro, Blue Chips (1994) with Nick Nolte, and Cobb (1994) with Tommy Lee Jones. He wrote two of the six episodes for the TV series Police Squad! in 1982 and did an audio commentary for its release on DVD in 2006.

He appeared with Keith Carradine in the 1985 music video to Madonna's "Material Girl". In 1992, he appeared in The Bodyguard as host of the Oscars. Wuhl won two Emmy Awards for co-writing the Academy Awards in 1990 and 1991 with Billy Crystal, Bruce Vilanch, David Steinberg, and others.

From 1996 to 2002, he wrote and starred in the HBO series Arliss as the title character, an agent for high-profile athletes. From 2000 to 2001, he was a frequent panelist on the ESPN game show 2 Minute Drill, often quizzing the contestants on sports-related movies.

In 2006, he starred on HBO in a one-man show, Assume the Position with Mr. Wuhl, where he taught a history class to show how history is created and propagated in a similar fashion to pop culture. A second chapter entitled Assume the Position 201 with Mr. Wuhl aired on HBO in July 2007.

Wuhl hosted a sports, sports business, and entertainment daily talk-radio show, for Westwood One from January through December 2011. Wuhl occasionally fills in for Boomer Esiason on the Boomer and Carton show.

Wuhl played Herb Tucker in a revival of Neil Simon's play I Ought to Be in Pictures. In 2017, he appeared with Don Most in another Simon play, The Sunshine Boys, at Judson Theatre Company.

Wuhl has appeared as himself in four episodes of American Dad!—the 2015 episode "Manhattan Magical Murder Mystery Tour", the 2017 episode "The Talented Mr. Dingleberry", the 2019 episode "One-Woman Swole", and the 2021 episode "Cry Baby".

== Filmography ==
=== Film ===
Year	Title	Role	Notes
1980	The Hollywood Knights	Newbomb Turk	
1983	Flashdance	Mawby's Regular	
1987	Good Morning, Vietnam	Marty Lee Dreiwitz	
1988	Bull Durham	Larry Hockett	
1989	Batman	Alexander Knox	
1989	Wedding Band	Waiter	
1989	Blaze	Red Snyder	
1991	Missing Pieces	Lou Wimpole	
1992	Mistress	Marvin Landisman	
1992	The Bodyguard	Oscar Host	
1993	Sandman	Victor Giles	
1994	Blue Chips	Marty	
1994	Cobb	Al Stump	
1995	Open Season	Stuart Sain	
1995	Dr. Jekyll and Ms. Hyde	Man with Lighter	
1997	Good Burger	Angry Customer	
1998	Welcome to Hollywood	Himself	
2013	Contest	Zack Conti	
2020	Shirley	Randy Fisher	
2022	The People's Joker	Himself	
2024	Saturday Night	Dave Wilson	

=== Television ===
Year	Title	Role	Notes
1987	Moonlighting	Nut in Holding Cell	Episode: "Blonde on Blonde"
1987	Falcon Crest	Stand-up Comic	Episode: "Topspin"
1987	L.A. Law	Crutchfeld	Episode: "Pigmalion"
1988	CBS Summer Playhouse	Sid Barrows	Episode: "Sniff"
1989	Tales from the Crypt	Barker	Episode: "Dig That Cat... He's Real Gone"
1989	Not Necessarily the News	Commentator	Episode #7.9
1993	Percy & Thunder	Jim Keisling	Television film
1996–2002	Arliss	Arliss Michaels	80 episodes
1997	The Last Don	Bobby Bantz	2 episodes
1998	The Last Don II	Bobby Bantz	2 episodes
2006–2007	Assume the Position with Mr. Wuhl	Himself	2 episodes
2007	Everybody Hates Chris	Abe Himmelfarb	Episode: "Everybody Hates DJs"
2007	Boston Legal	Bob Binder	Episode: "Oral Contracts"
2012–2013	Franklin & Bash	Hon. Maxwell Nulis	2 episodes
2015–2023	American Dad!	Himself	5 episodes
2016	Blue Bloods	Captain Ward Gibson	Episode: "Whistleblowers"
2019	Supergirl	Alexander Knox	Episode: "Crisis on Infinite Earths: Part One"
2020	Home Movie: The Princess Bride	The Grandfather	Episode: "Chapter Eight: Ultimate Suffering"
2020–2021, 2025	The George Lucas Talk Show	Himself	13 episodes
