= Steven M. Wise =

American legal scholar (1950–2024)

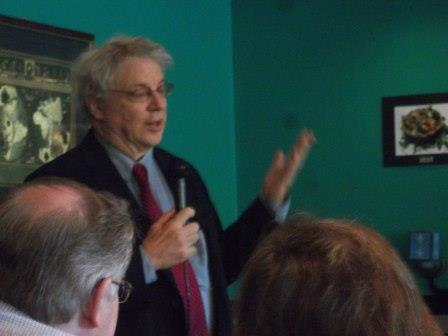
- Born: December 19, 1950; US
- Died: February 15, 2024 (aged 73); Coral Springs, Florida, US
- Education: College of William & Mary (BA); Boston University (JD)
- Occupation: Animal rights attorney
- Known for: Animal rights advocacy, abolitionism
- Spouses: Debra Slater-Wise (div. 2002); Gail Price-Wise, MPH

Steven M. Wise (December 19, 1950 – February 15, 2024) was an American lawyer and legal scholar who specialized in animal rights, primatology, and animal intelligence. He taught animal rights law at Harvard Law School, Vermont Law School, John Marshall Law School, Lewis & Clark Law School, Tufts University School of Veterinary Medicine, and at the Master’s in Animal Law and Society of the Autonomous University of Barcelona. He was a former president of the Animal Legal Defense Fund and founder and president of the Nonhuman Rights Project. The Yale Law Journal called him "one of the pistons of the animal rights movement."

Wise was the author of An American Trilogy (2009), which tells the story of how a piece of land in Tar Heel, North Carolina, was first the home of Native Americans until they were driven into near-extinction, then a slave plantation, and finally the site of factory hog farms and the world's largest slaughterhouse. His book, Though the Heavens May Fall (2005), recounts the 1772 trial in England of James Somersett, a black man rescued from a ship heading for the West Indies slave markets, which gave impetus to the movement to abolish slavery in Britain and the United States (see Somersett's Case). He also wrote Drawing the Line (2002), which describes the relative intelligence of animals and human beings, and Rattling the Cage (2000), in which he argued that certain basic legal rights should be extended to chimpanzees and bonobos.

The documentary Unlocking the Cage (2016) follows Wise in parts of his struggle for chimpanzees.

== Background ==
Wise received his undergraduate education in chemistry at the College of William & Mary in Williamsburg, Virginia. Wise first became interested in politics through his involvement in the anti-Vietnam War movement while at William & Mary. Wise studied law at Boston University and was awarded his J.D. there in 1976, then became a personal injury lawyer. He was inspired to move into the area of animal rights after reading Peter Singer's Animal Liberation (1975), often referred to as "the bible of the animal liberation movement". A practicing animal protection attorney, he was president of the nonprofit Nonhuman Rights Project, where he directed its Nonhuman Rights Project, the continuing purpose of which is to obtain basic common law rights for at least some nonhuman animals. Wise lived in Coral Springs, Florida, with his children Chris and Siena. He died there of glioblastoma, a form of brain cancer, on February 15, 2024, at the age of 73.

== Animal personhood ==
Wise's position on animal rights is that some animals, particularly primates, meet the criteria of legal personhood, and should therefore be awarded certain rights and protections. His criteria for personhood are that the animal must be able to desire things, to act in an intentional manner to acquire those things, and must have a sense of self — must know that he or she exists. Wise argues that chimpanzees, bonobos, elephants, parrots, dolphins, orangutans, and gorillas meet these criteria.

Wise argued that these animals should have legal personhood bestowed upon them to protect them from "serious infringements upon their bodily integrity and bodily liberty." Without personhood in law, he writes, one is "invisible to civil law" and "might as well be dead."

Wise wrote in "The Problem with Being a Thing" in Rattling the Cage:

For four thousand years, a thick and impenetrable legal wall has separated all human from all nonhuman animals. On one side, even the most trivial interests of a single species — ours — are jealously guarded. We have assigned ourselves, alone among the million animal species, the status of "legal persons." On the other side of that wall lies the legal refuse of an entire kingdom, not just chimpanzees and bonobos but also gorillas, orangutans, and monkeys, dogs, elephants, and dolphins. They are treated as "legal things." Their most basic and fundamental interests — their pains, their lives, their freedoms — are intentionally ignored, often maliciously trampled, and routinely abused. Ancient philosophers claimed that all nonhuman animals had been designed and placed on this earth just for human beings. Ancient jurists declared that law had been created just for human beings. Although philosophy and science have long since recanted, the law has not.

In Rattling the Cage, Wise offers examples of primates who he believed have suffered unjustifiably. He wrote about Jerom, a chimpanzee who lived alone in a small cage in the Yerkes Regional Primate Research Center, with no access to sunlight, after being infected with one strain of HIV when he was three, another at the age of four, and a third at the age of five, before dying in 1996 at the age of 14.

Wise also told the story of Lucy Temerlin, a six-year-old chimpanzee who learned American Sign Language from Roger Fouts, the primatologist, and was raised by Maurice K. Temerlin and Temerlin Mcclain. Fouts would arrive at Lucy's home at 8:30 every morning, when Lucy would greet him with a hug, go to the stove, take the kettle, fill it with water from the sink, find two cups and tea bags from the cupboard, and brew and serve the tea. When she was 12, the Temerlins were no longer able to care for her. She was sent to a chimpanzee rehabilitation center in Senegal, then flown to Gambia, where she was shot and skinned by a poacher, and her feet and hands hacked off for sale as trophies.

== Seminars ==
Wise has been profiled in Who's Who in the World as well as other editions of Who's Who since 2005. He was a frequent guest on a wide variety of television and radio news and talk shows throughout Europe, Africa, Australia, New Zealand, and North America.

Wise spoke frequently on topics related to animal rights law at law schools, legal conferences, and universities throughout North and South America, Europe, Australia, New Zealand, and Africa, including Harvard Law School, Monash University Law School, and the University of Stellenbosch among others.

Wise taught animal rights law and jurisprudence at the Harvard, Vermont, Lewis and Clark, University of Miami, St. Thomas, and John Marshall Law Schools.

== Works ==
=== Books ===
- Rattling the Cage: Toward Legal Rights for Animals, Perseus Books, Cambridge, Massachusetts, 2000 ISBN 0738200654 (called a "seminal work" by the Boston Globe (March 3, 2005); Time magazine observed "[o]nce the domain of activists, animal law has steadily gained respect among law schools and legal scholars since 2000, when … Rattling the Cage provided an academic argument for granting legal rights to animals" (December 13, 2004)) .
- Drawing the Line: Science and the Case for Animal Rights, Perseus Publishing, Cambridge, Massachusetts, 2002. ISBN 0738203408
- Though the Heavens May Fall, Da Capo Press, Cambridge, Massachusetts, 2005 (cover review for Sunday New York Times Book Review, January 9, 2005). ISBN 0738206954
- An American Trilogy: Death, Slavery, and Dominion Along the Banks of the Cape Fear River, Da Capo Press, 2009. ISBN 9780306814754 (a review)

== See also ==
- Chimpanzee and Human Communication Institute
- Gary Francione
- Ingrid Newkirk
- Jane Goodall
- List of animal rights advocates
- Paul Waldau
- Peter Singer
- Richard D. Ryder
- Stephen R. L. Clark
- Steven Best
- Tom Regan
- Washoe
