= L'Arc de Triomphe, Wrapped =

2021 artwork and event

Coordinates: 48°52′25.67″N 2°17′42.04″E

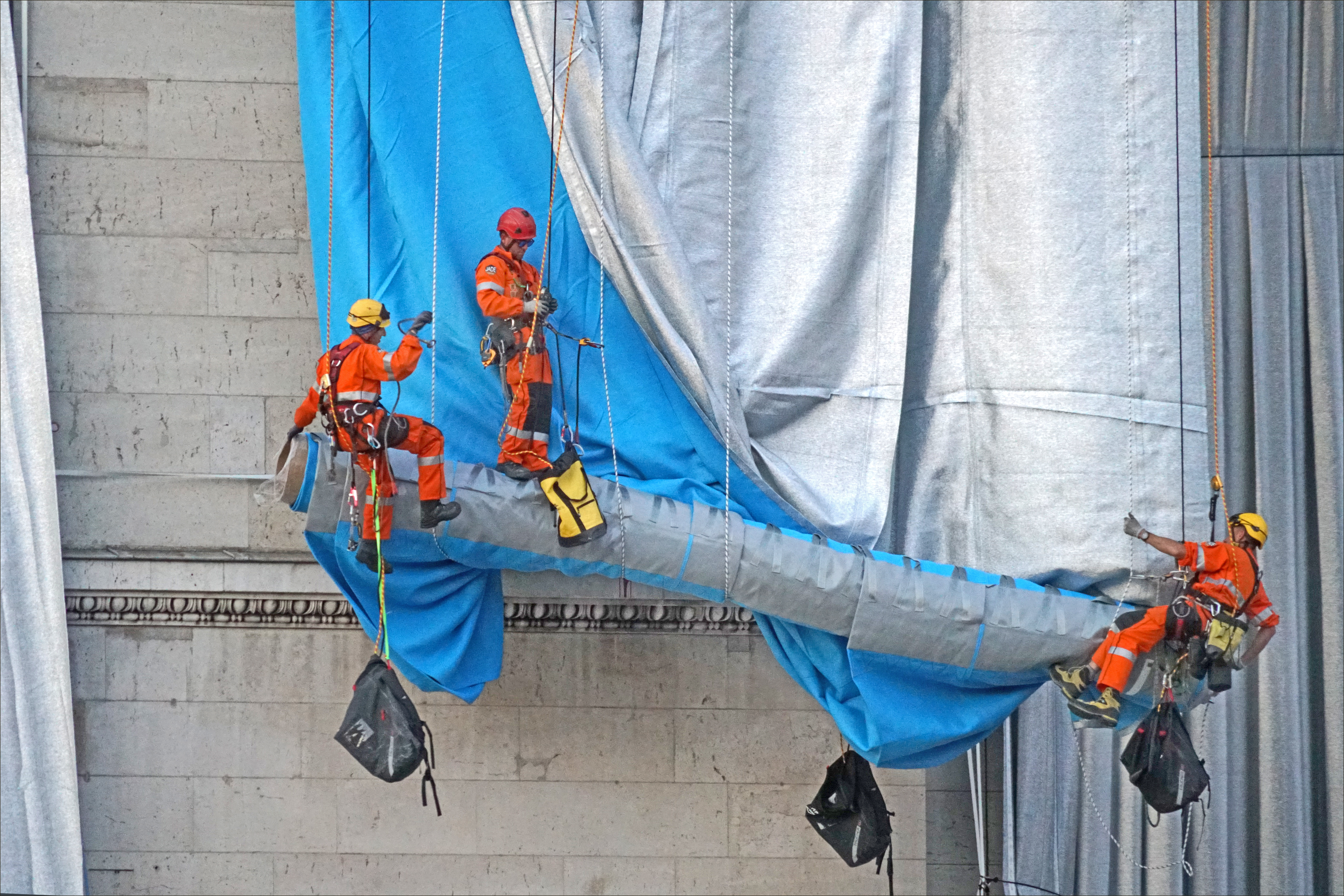
- South-western facade of the Arc de Triomphe (Avenue Kléber) being wrapped
- Artist: Christo and Jeanne-Claude
- Completion date: 18 September 2021
- Type: Site-specific art
- Condition: Dismantled
- Location: Arc de Triomphe, Paris
- Website: L'Arc de Triomphe, Wrapped

L'Arc de Triomphe, Wrapped, known as "L'Arc de Triomphe Empaqueté" in French, was a temporary art installation by artists Christo and Jeanne-Claude where the Arc de Triomphe in Paris was wrapped in a silver-blue fabric and red rope for two weeks in 2021.

== Planning and execution ==
Christo and Jeanne-Claude are known for wrapping public monuments, including the Wrapped Reichstag in Berlin, The Pont Neuf Wrapped in Paris, and The Gates in New York.

Christo and Jeanne-Claude first thought of wrapping the Arc de Triomphe de l'Etoile when he lived nearby in 1961. Actual planning began in 2018, intending completion in the spring of 2020 to coincide with an exhibition on the artists at the Pompidou Center. Christo wanted to work "beyond the exhibition." It was the first work in their signature style since Jeanne-Claude's death in 2009.

The work was self-financed through sales of project documentation, including drawings and models. The final cost was about 14 million Euros ($16.54 million). Governmental approval came quickly in comparison to the waits for their previous projects.

Initially slated to run for two weeks in April 2020, the work was first delayed until September 2020 to accommodate kestrel falcons nesting in the monument during the spring.

On 31 May 2020, Christo died, and France 24 announced that the project would resume with Christo's plans' integrity. After further delays due to the COVID-19 pandemic, it finally debuted in September 2021.

L'Arc de Triomphe, Wrapped, was one of their most significant works, with 25,000 square meters of recyclable, silver-blue polypropylene fabric fastened with 3,000 meters of red rope.

Overall preparation of the project took about three months, while installation occurred over a single day. Throughout the installation and removal processes, the eternal flame alongside remembrance ceremonies for the tomb of the unknown soldiers was never disturbed. Over the weekend, the display was up for viewing, and the city closed the immediately surrounding roads for safe observation and photo opportunities; however, selfie sticks were not allowed.

== Concept ==
The direct concept behind the wrapping is not explicit; however, scholars have theories as to Christo and Jeanne-Claude's intentions. Christo went to art school in Bulgaria under a communist government. This restricted many opportunities through his art and education, so people believed the wrapping of monuments represented freedom.

Christo also opposed the widespread notion that a tremendous honor is sacrificing oneself for their country. Covering a monument that represents the tomb of unknown soldiers may have been a public challenge to this notion. Napoleon originally commissioned the structure, and King Louis XVIII later took it over to commemorate controversial portions of French history. The coverage of the arch may have been to denounce a history that is shameful for many citizens.

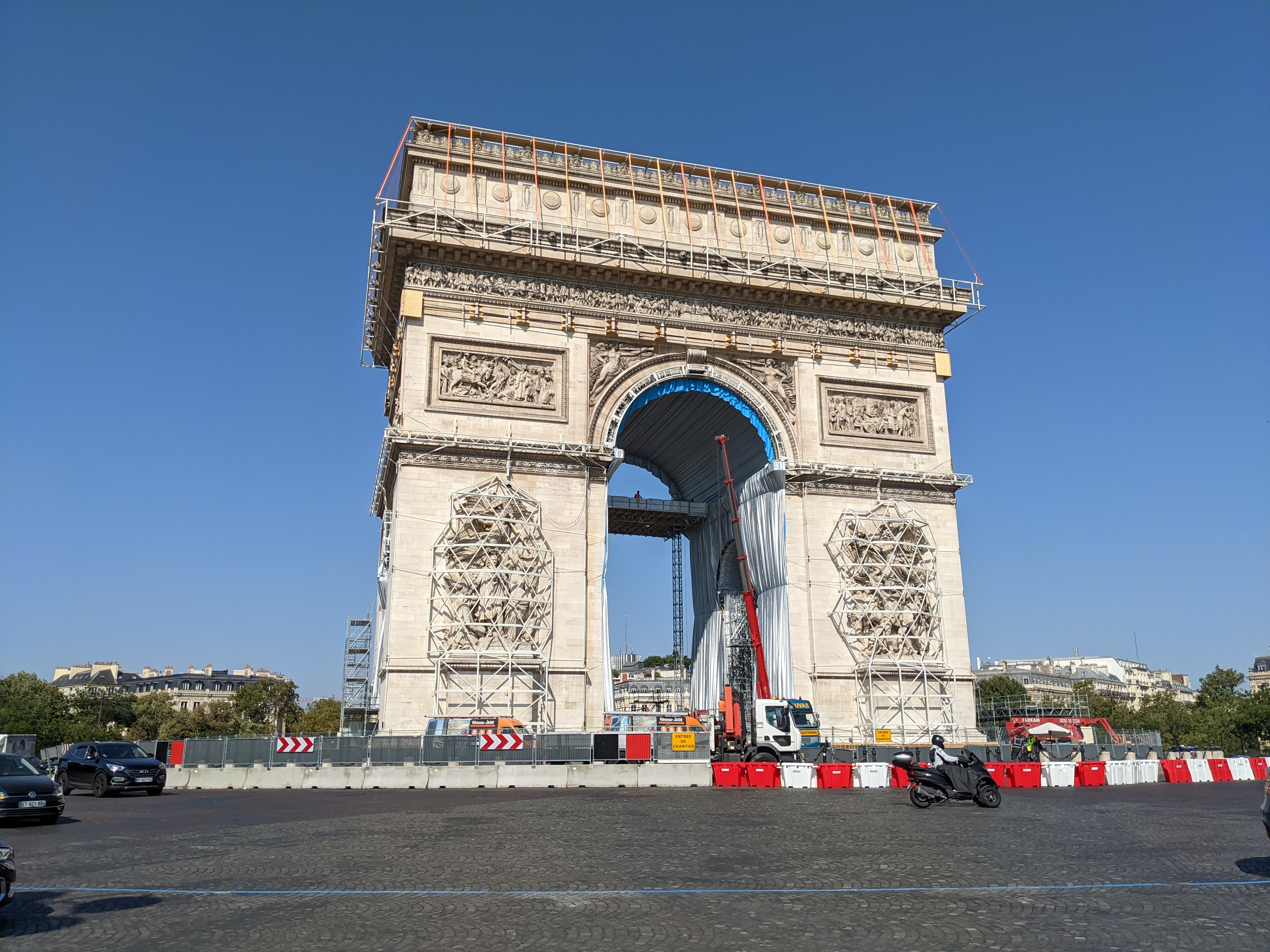
The Arc de Triomphe being prepared for wrapping

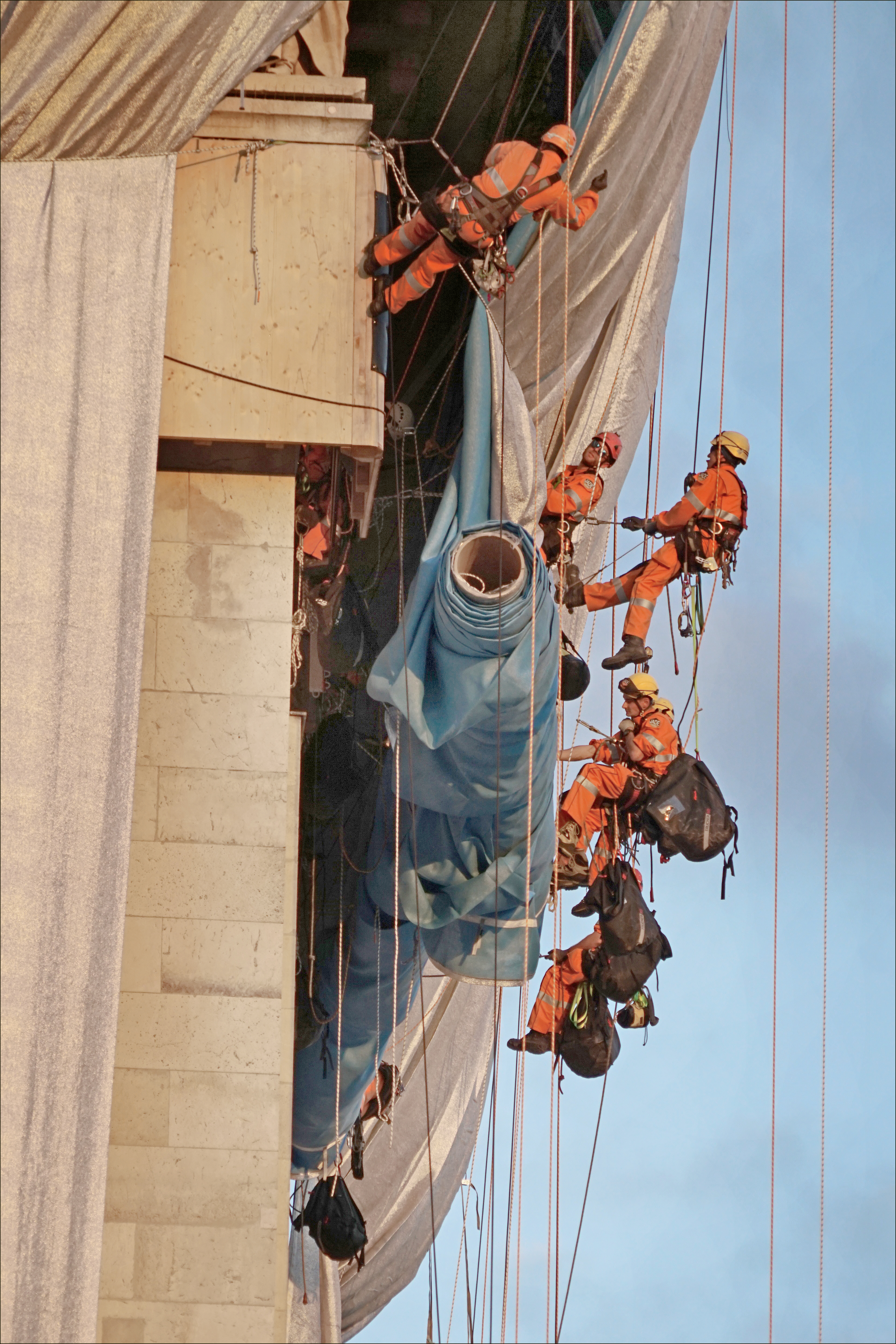
The Arc de Triomphe being wrapped

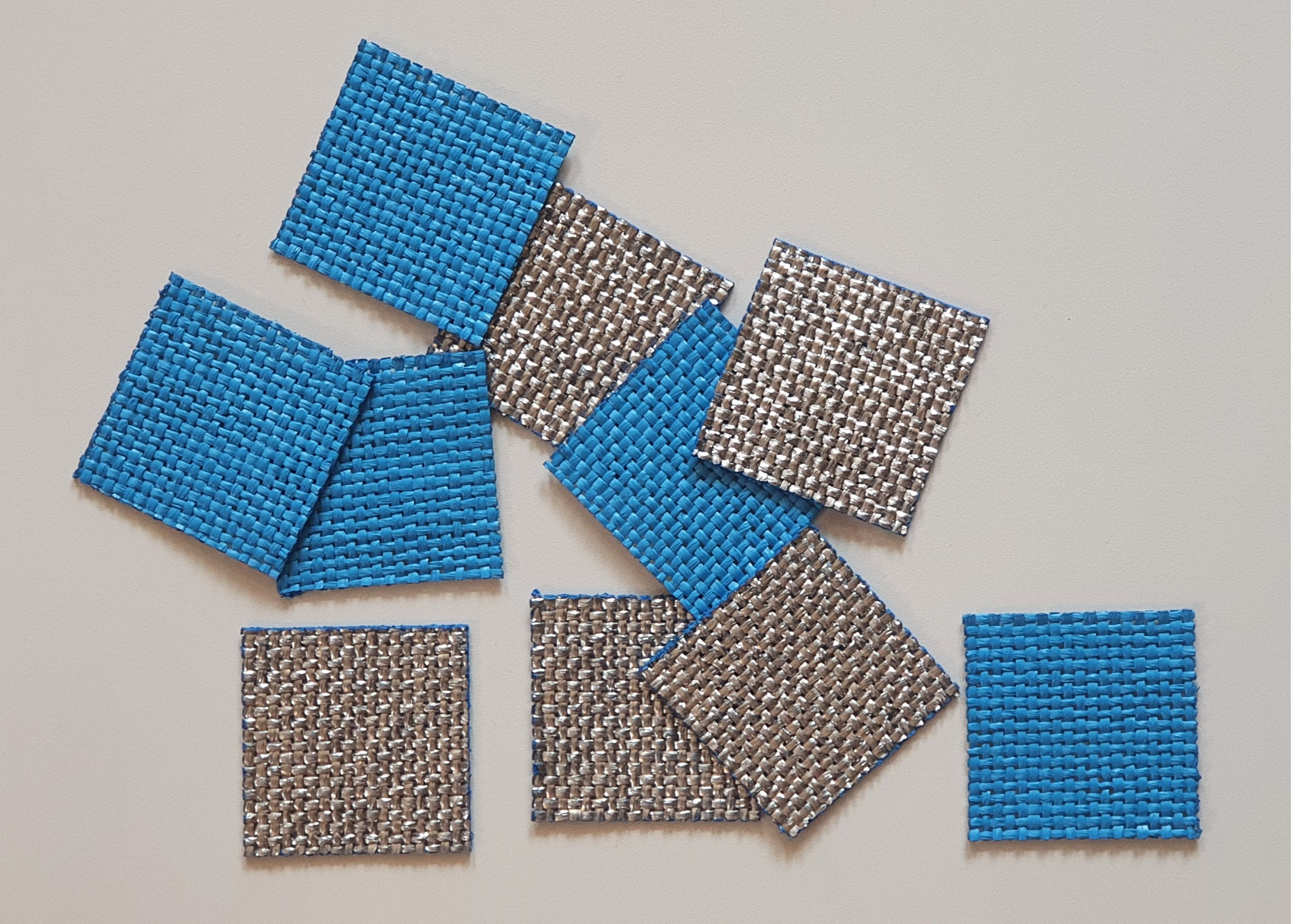
Samples of the silver-blue fabric

== Public reaction ==
There was a mixed public opinion. In an interview with the Harvard Gazette, psychologist Ellen Winner spoke about the psychological reasoning behind these mixed opinions. On the one hand, the wrapped monument creates a newfound understanding of the structure's immense size. Conceptual art can be confusing for many people provoking curiosity and thought towards its intentions, as they are not explicit. Disapproval was commonly rooted in those who believed it was wrong to cover such an architecturally creative and well-known structure.
