= Christo and Jeanne-Claude =

Husband-and-wife environmental installation artist duo

Jeanne-Claude and Christo
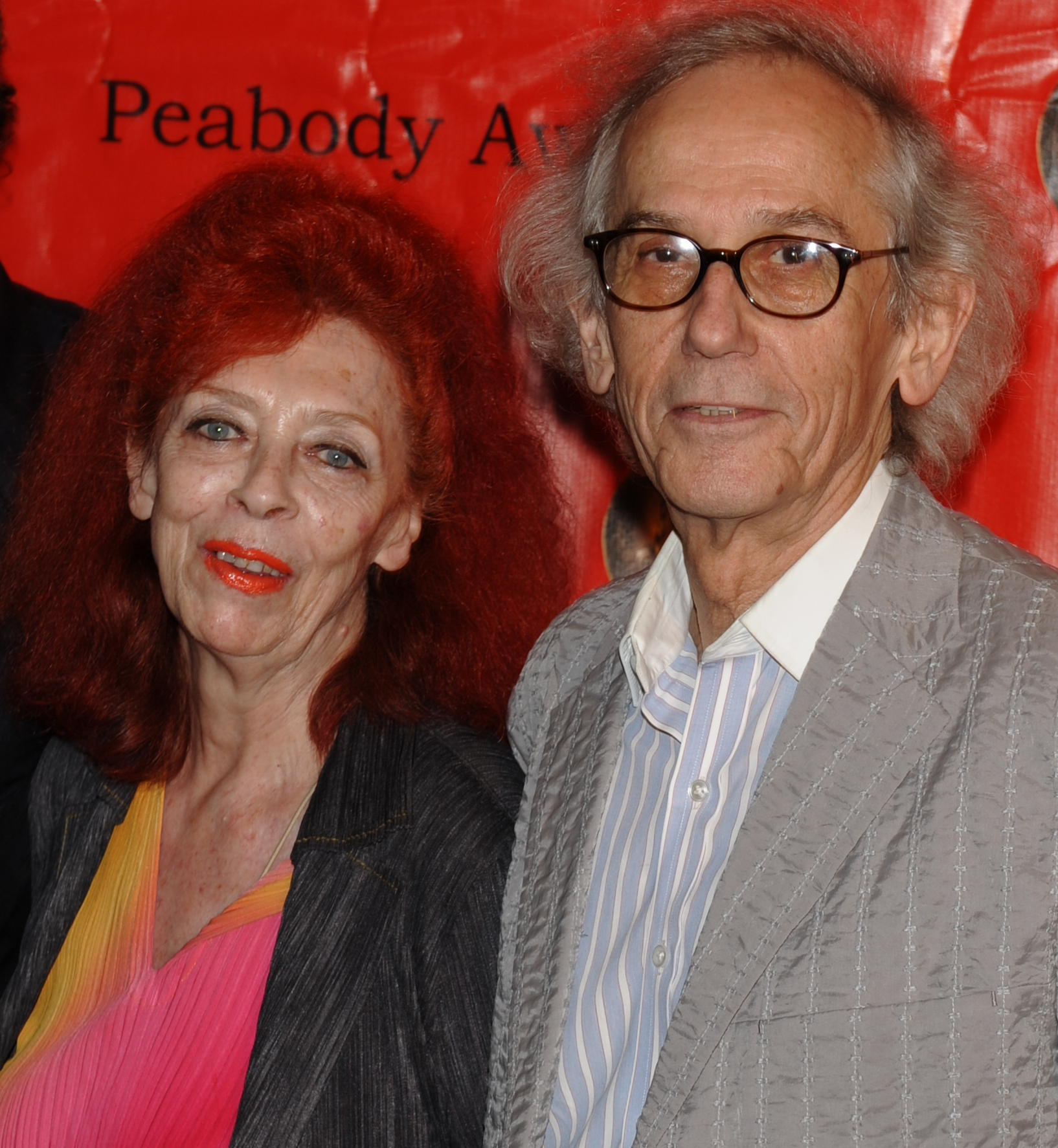
- Jeanne-Claude and Christo in 2009
- Known for: Environmental art Site-specific land art
- Notable work: Running Fence (1972–1976); Wrapped Reichstag (1979–1995); The Gates (1979–2005); Surrounded Islands (1980-1983); The Floating Piers (2014–2016); L'Arc de Triomphe, Wrapped (1961–2021)
- Movement: Nouveau réalisme
- Children: Cyril Christo
- Christo Vladimirov Javacheff
- Born: June 13, 1935; Gabrovo, Bulgaria
- Died: May 31, 2020 (aged 84); New York City, U.S.
- Education: Sofia Academy of Fine Arts; Vienna Academy of Fine Arts
- Jeanne-Claude Denat de Guillebon
- Born: June 13, 1935; Casablanca, Morocco
- Died: November 18, 2009 (aged 74); New York City, U.S.

Christo Vladimirov Javacheff (1935–2020; Bulgarian: Христо Владимиров Явашев) and Jeanne-Claude Denat de Guillebon (1935–2009), known as Christo and Jeanne-Claude, were artists noted for their large-scale, site-specific environmental installations, often large landmarks and landscape elements wrapped in fabric, including the Wrapped Reichstag, The Pont Neuf Wrapped, Running Fence in California, and The Gates in New York City's Central Park.

Christo and Jeanne-Claude were both born on June 13, 1935, in Bulgaria and Morocco, respectively. The pair met and married in Paris in the late 1950s. Originally working under Christo's name, they later credited their installations to both "Christo and Jeanne-Claude". Until his own death in 2020, Christo continued to plan and execute projects after Jeanne-Claude's death in 2009.

Their work was typically large, visually impressive, and controversial, often taking years and sometimes decades of careful preparation – including technical solutions, political negotiation, permitting and environmental approval, hearings and public persuasion. The pair refused grants, scholarships, donations or public money, instead financing the work via the sale of their own artwork. Christo stated in 2018, “I studied Karl Marx in school and, though I may be anti-corporation, I am not anti-capitalist – in fact, we work closely with banks; Citibank, Credit Suisse, so many others.”

Christo and Jeanne-Claude described the myriad elements that brought the projects to fruition as integral to the artwork itself, and said their projects contained no deeper meaning than their immediate aesthetic impact; their purpose being simply for joy, beauty, and new ways of seeing the familiar.

== Career ==
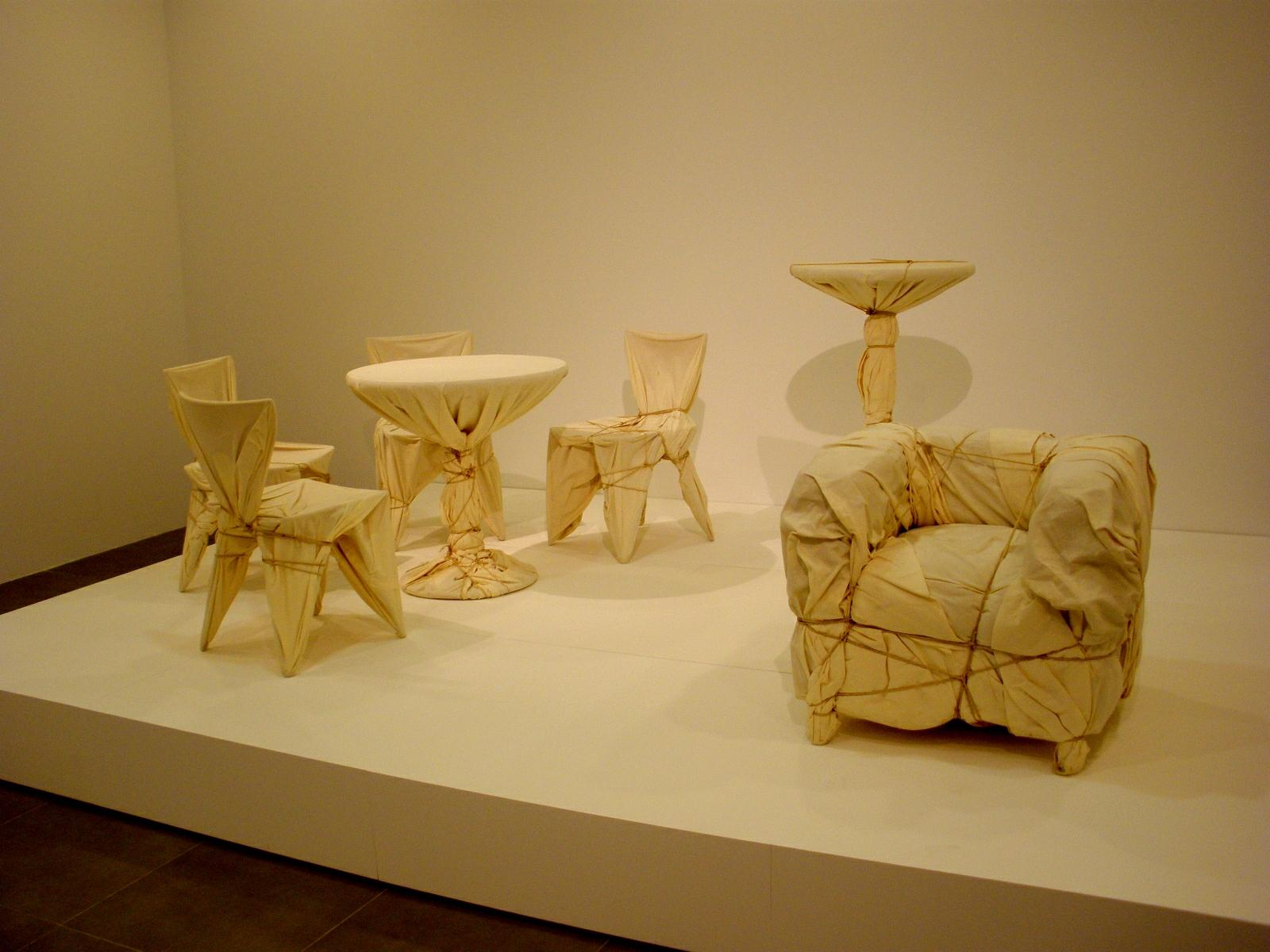
Würth Rioja wrapped chairs

Christo and Jeanne-Claude met in October 1958 when he was commissioned to paint a portrait of her mother, Précilda de Guillebon. Their first show, in Cologne, 1961, showcased the three types of artworks for which they would be known: wrapped items, oil barrels, and ephemeral, large-scale works. Near Christo's first solo show in Paris, in 1962, the pair blocked an alley with 240 barrels for several hours in a piece called Iron Curtain, a poetic reply to the Berlin Wall.

They developed consistent and longtime terms of their collaboration. They together imagined projects, for which Christo would create sketches and preparatory works that were later sold to fund the resulting installation. Christo and Jeanne-Claude hired assistants to do the work of wrapping the object at hand. They originally worked under the name "Christo" to simplify dealings and their brand, given the difficulties of establishing an artist's reputation and the prejudices against female artists, but they would later retroactively credit their large-scale outdoor works to both "Christo and Jeanne-Claude". They eventually flew in separate planes such that, in case one crashed, the other could continue their work.

The couple relocated to New York City, the new art world capital, in 1964. Christo began to make Store Fronts, wooden facades made to resemble shop windows, which he continued for four years. His largest piece was shown in the 1968 Documenta 4. In the mid-1960s, they also created Air Packages, inflated and wrapped research balloons. In 1969, at the invitation of the museum director Jan van der Marck they wrapped the Chicago Museum of Contemporary Art while it remained open. It was panned by the public and ordered to be undone by the fire department, but the order went unenforced. With the help of Australian collector John Kaldor, Christo and Jeanne-Claude and 100 volunteers wrapped the coast of Sydney's Little Bay as Wrapped Coast, the first piece for Kaldor Public Art Projects.

=== 1970s ===
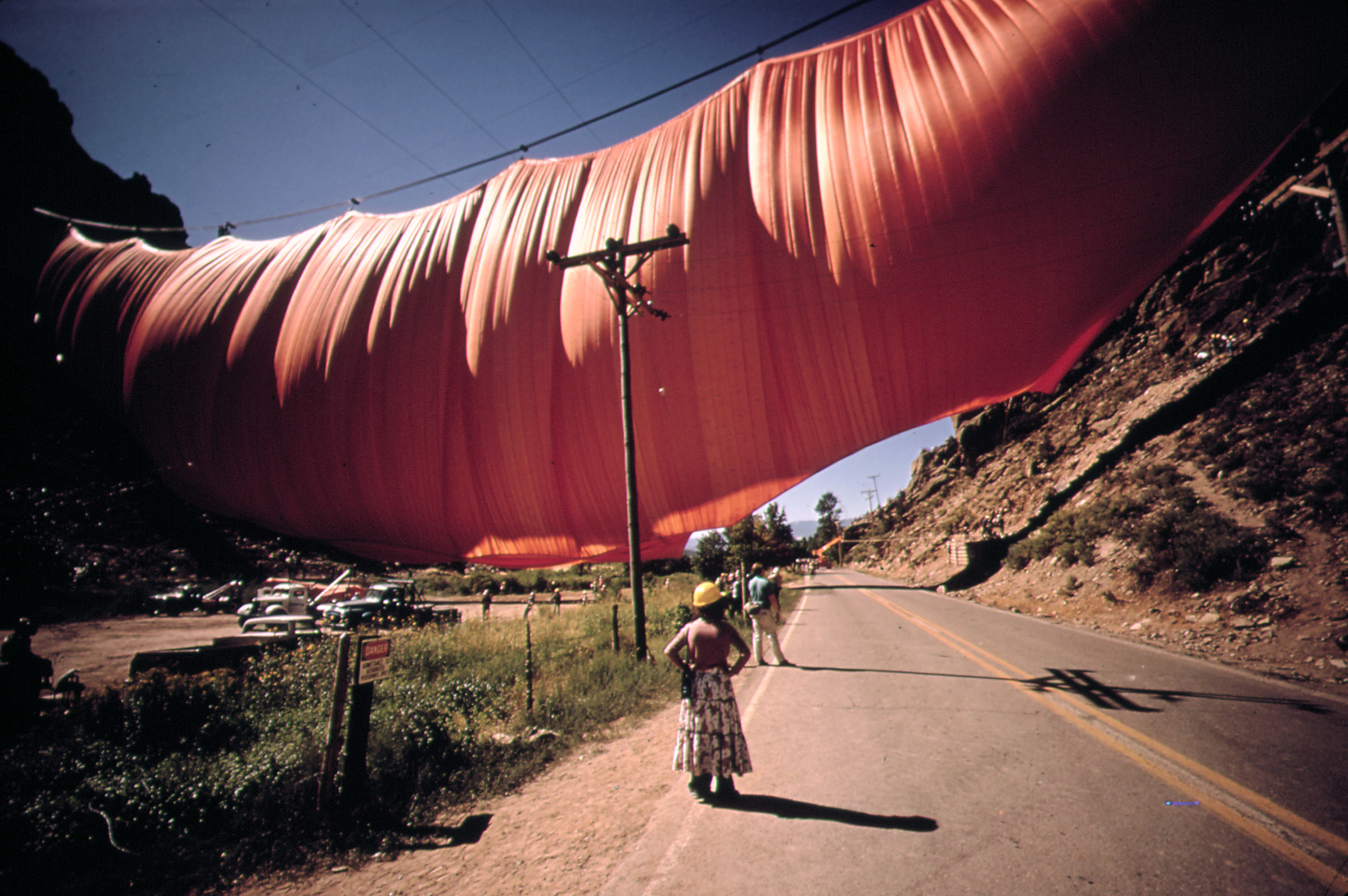
Valley Curtain (1972)

Within a year of Wrapped Coast, Christo began work on Valley Curtain: an orange curtain of fabric to be hung across the mountainous Colorado State Highway 325. They simultaneously worked on Wrapped Walk Ways (Tokyo and Holland) and Wrapped Island (South Pacific), neither of which came to fruition. The artists formed a corporation to benefit from tax and other liabilities, a form they used for later projects. Following a failed attempt to mount the curtain in late 1971, a new engineer and builder-contractor raised the fabric in August 1972. The work only stood for 28 hours before the wind again destroyed the fabric. This work, their most expensive to date and first to involve construction workers, was captured in a documentary by David and Albert Maysles. Christo's Valley Curtain was nominated for Best Documentary Short in the 1974 Academy Awards. The Maysles would film many of the artists' later projects.

Inspired by a snow fence, in 1972, Christo and Jeanne-Claude began preparations for Running Fence: a 24.5-mile fence of white nylon, supported by steel posts and steel cables, running through the California landscape and into the ocean. In exchange for temporary use of ranch land, the artists agreed to offer payment and use of the deconstructed building materials. Others challenged its construction in 18 public hearings and three state court sessions. The fence began construction in April 1976 and the project culminated in a two-week display in September, after which it was deconstructed.

Their 1978 Wrapped Walk Ways covered paths within Kansas City, Missouri's Loose Park in 12,540 square meters (135,000 square feet) of saffron-colored nylon fabric covering 4.4 kilometers (2.7 miles) of the park's formal garden walkways and jogging paths.

=== 1980s ===
Christo and Jeanne-Claude planned a project based on Jeanne-Claude's idea to surround eleven islands in Miami's Biscayne Bay with 603,850 m^{2} (6,499,800 sq ft) of pink polypropylene floating fabric. Surrounded Islands was completed on May 7, 1983, with the aid of 430 workers and could be admired for two weeks. The workers were outfitted with pink long sleeve shirts with pale blue text written on the back reading “Christo Surrounded Islands”, and then in acknowledging the garment's designer, "designed and produced by Willi Smith".

Jeanne-Claude became an American citizen in March 1984. The couple received permission to wrap the Pont Neuf, a bridge in Paris, in August 1985. The bridge stayed wrapped for two weeks (22 Sep - 5 Oct 1985). The Pont Neuf Wrapped attracted three million visitors. Wrapping the Pont Neuf continued the tradition of transforming a sculptural dimension into a work of art. The fabric maintained the principal shapes of the Pont Neuf but it emphasized the details and the proportions. As with Surrounded Islands, workers who assisted with the installation and deinstallation of Pont Neuf Wrapped wore uniforms designed by Willi Smith.

=== 1990s ===
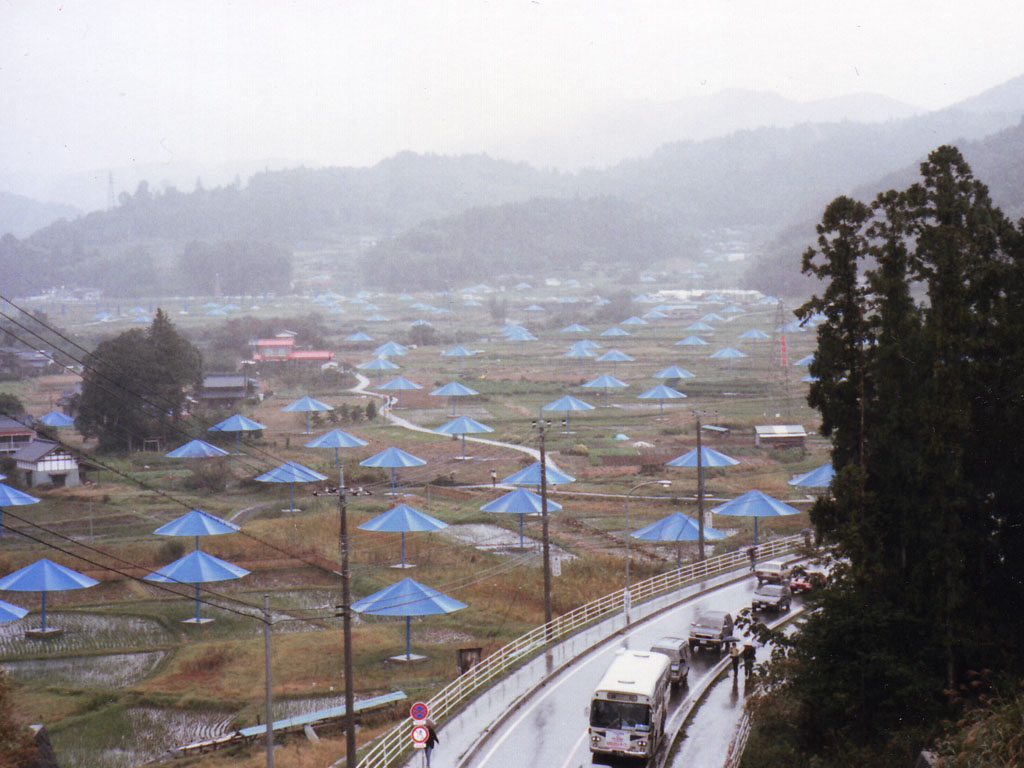
The Umbrellas (1991)

Their 1991 The Umbrellas involved the simultaneous setup of blue and gold umbrellas in Japan and California, respectively. The 3,100-umbrella project cost US$26 million and attracted three million visitors. Christo closed the exhibition early after a woman was killed by a windblown umbrella in California. Separately, a worker was killed during the deconstruction of the Japanese exhibit.

Christo and Jeanne-Claude wrapped the Berlin Reichstag building in 1995 following 24 years of governmental lobbying across six Bundestag presidents. Wrapped Reichstag's 100,000 square meters of silver fabric draped the building, fastened with blue rope. Christo described the Reichstag wrapping as autobiographical based on his Bulgarian upbringing. The wrapping became symbolic of unified Germany and marked Berlin's return as a world city. The Guardian posthumously described the work as their "most spectacular achievement".

In 1998, the artists wrapped trees at the Beyeler Foundation and its nearby Berower Park. Prior attempts had failed to secure government support in St. Louis, Missouri, and Paris. The work was self-funded through sale of photographic documentation and preparatory works, as had become standard for the couple.

=== The Gates ===
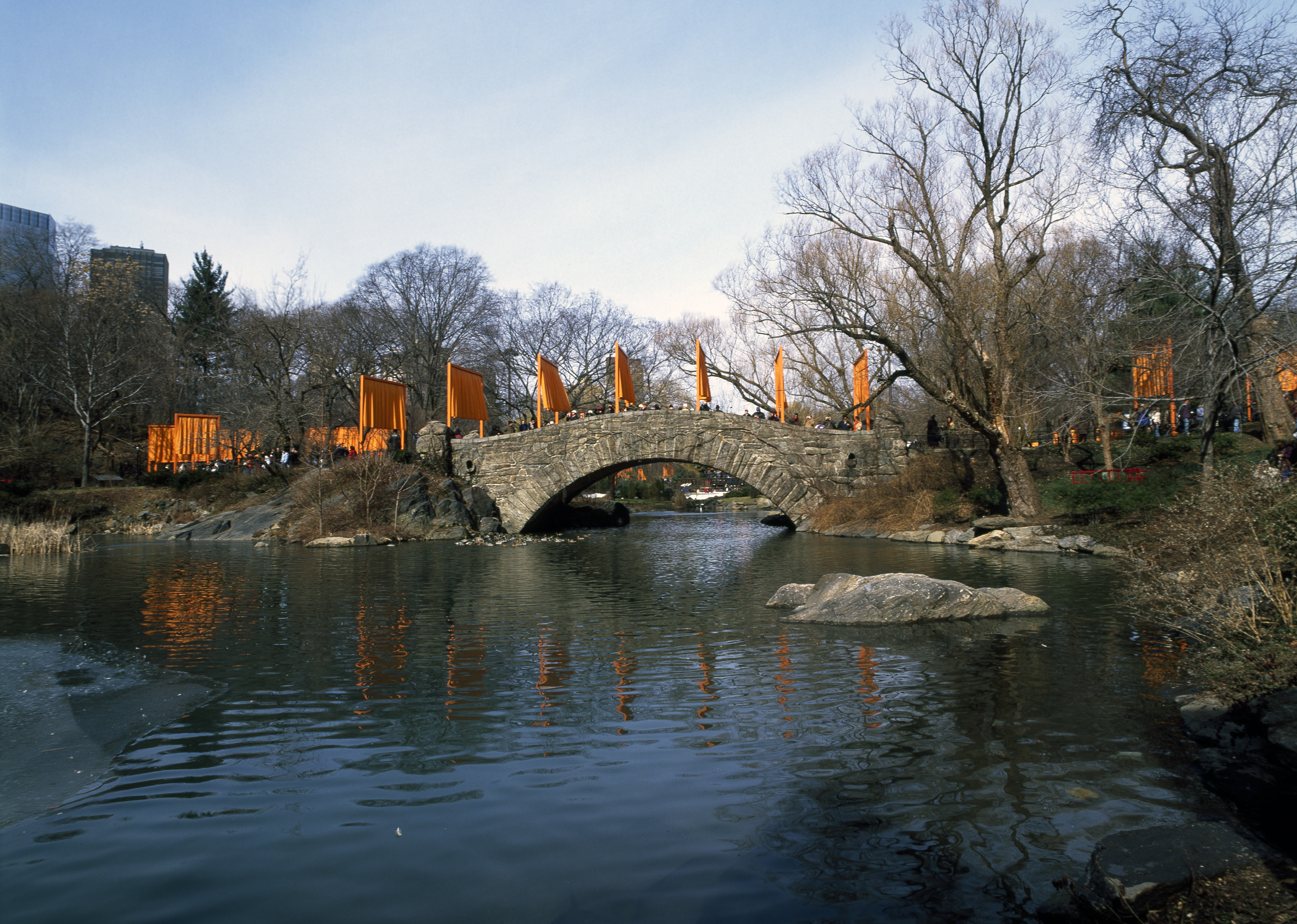
The Gates (2005)

Work began on the installation of the couple's most protracted project, The Gates, in New York City's Central Park in January 2005. Its full title, The Gates, Central Park, New York, 1979–2005, refers to the time elapsed between the year of the artists' initial proposal and the year they were allowed to proceed, having received permission from the newly elected mayor Michael R. Bloomberg. The Gates was open to the public from February 12–27, 2005. A total of 7,503 gates made of saffron-colored fabric were placed on paths in Central Park. They were five meters (16 ft) high and had a combined length of 37 km (23 mi). The mayor presented them with the Doris C. Freedman Award for public art. The project cost an estimated US$21 million, which the artists planned to recoup by selling project documentation.

=== Big Air Package ===
Christo filled the Gasometer Oberhausen from March 16 until December 30, 2013, with the installation Big Air Package. After The Wall (1999) as the final installation of the Emscher Park International Building Exhibition, Big Air Package was his second work of art in the Gasometer. The "Big Air Package – Project for Gasometer Oberhausen, Germany" was conceived by Christo in 2010 (for the first time without his wife Jeanne-Claude). The sculpture was set up in the interior of the industrial monument and was made of 20,350 m^{3} (719,000 cu ft) of translucent fabric and 4,500 m (14,800 ft) of rope. In the inflated state, the envelope, with a weight of 5.3 tonnes (5.8 short tons), reached a height of more than 90 m (300 ft), a diameter of 50 m (160 ft) and a volume of 177,000 m^{3} (6,300,000 cu ft). The monumental work of art was, temporarily, the largest self-supporting sculpture in the world. In the accessible interior of Big Air Package, the artist generated a unique experience of space, proportions, and light.

=== X-TO+J-C: Christo and Jeanne-Claude Featuring Works from the Bequest of David C. Copley ===
In 2014, the Museum of Contemporary Art San Diego presented the exhibit X-TO + J-C: Christo and Jeanne-Claude Featuring Works from the Bequest of David C. Copley, one of the museum's patrons and trustees who also had the largest collection of Christo and Jeanne-Claude's work in the United States. X-TO + J-C featured more than fifty works by Christo and Jeanne-Claude, including pieces such as Christo's evocative Package (1960), alongside drawings related to his early concealed objects: chairs, road signs, and other commonplace items. Christo himself gave a lecture in which he discussed two works that were in progress: Over the River, Project for the Arkansas River, Colorado, and The Mastaba, Project for the United Arab Emirates.

=== The Floating Piers ===
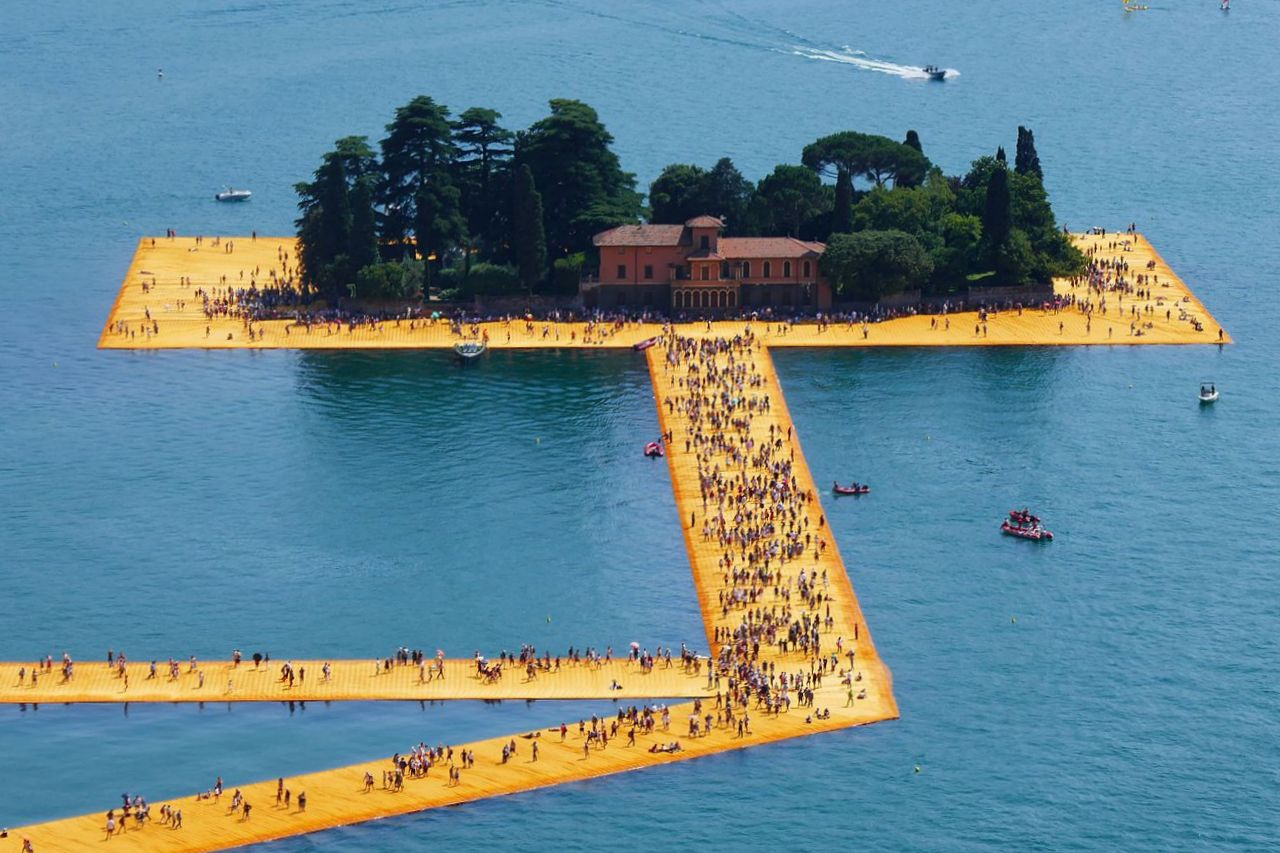
The Floating Piers (2016)

The Floating Piers were a series of walkways installed at Lake Iseo near Brescia, Italy. From June 18 to July 3, 2016, visitors were able to walk just above the surface of the water from the village of Sulzano on the mainland to the islands of Monte Isola and San Paolo. The floating walkways were made of around 200,000 polyethene cubes covered with 70,000 m^{2} (750,000 sq ft) of bright yellow fabric: 3 km (1.9 mi) of piers moved on the water; another 1.5 km (0.93 mi) of golden fabric continued along the pedestrian streets in Sulzano and Peschiera Maraglio. After the exhibition, all components were to be removed and recycled. The installation was facilitated by the Beretta family, owners of the oldest active manufacturer of firearm components in the world and the primary sidearm supplier of the U.S. Army. The Beretta family owns the island of San Paolo, which was surrounded by Floating Piers walkways. The work was a success with the Italian public and critics as well.

=== The London Mastaba ===
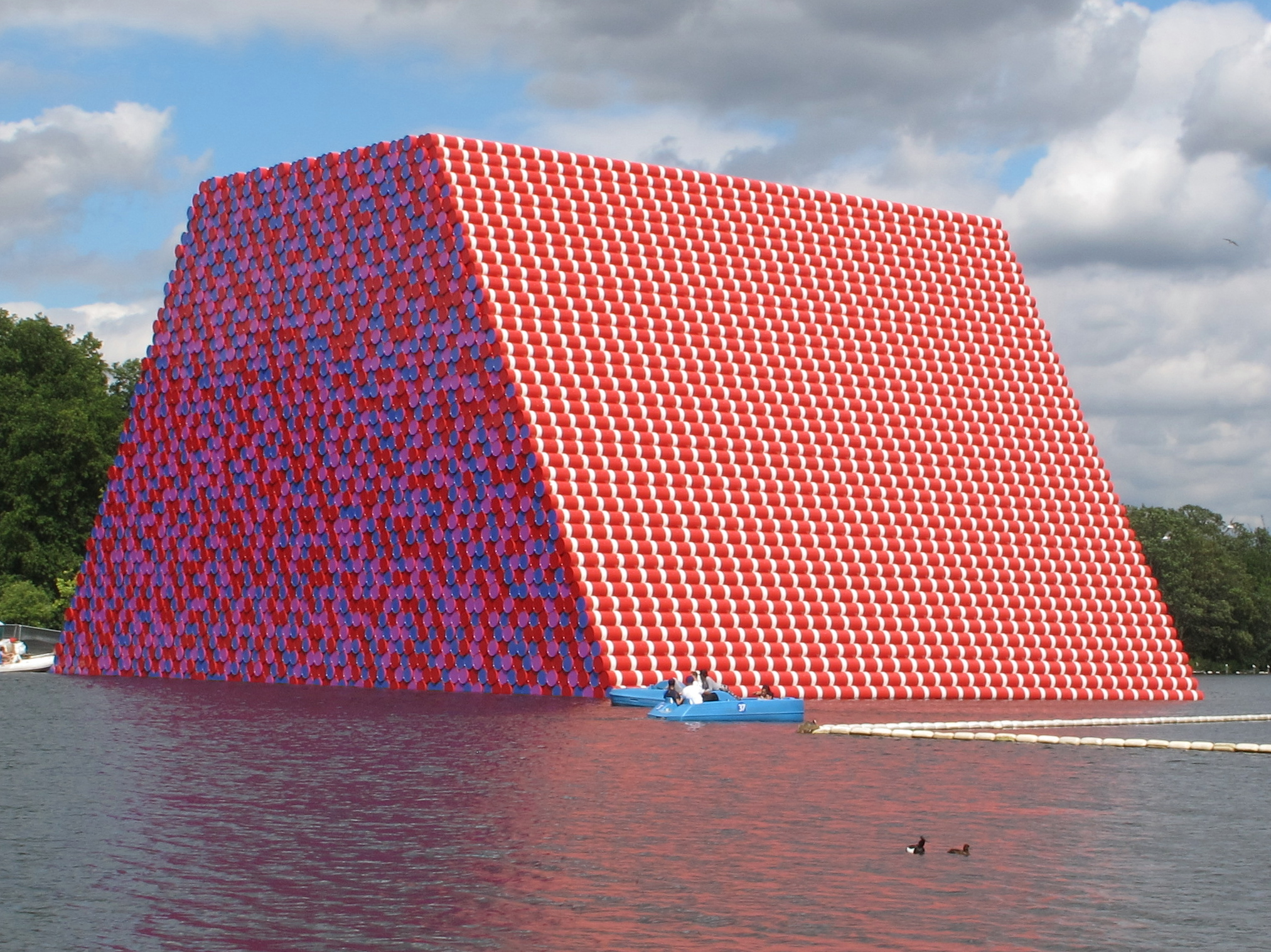
The London Mastaba (2018)

The London Mastaba was a temporary floating installation exhibited from June to September 2018 on The Serpentine in London. The installation consisted of 7,506 oil barrels, in the shape of a mastaba, a form of an early bench, as well as a style of tomb, in use in ancient Mesopotamia, with a flat roof and inward sloping sides. It sat on a floating platform of high-density polyethene, held in place by 32 anchors. It was 20 m (66 ft) in height and weighed 600 tonnes (660 short tons). The vertical ends were painted in a mosaic of red, blue and mauve, whilst the sloping sides were in red with bands of white.

Simultaneously with the display of The London Mastaba, the nearby Serpentine Gallery presented an exhibition of the artists' work, entitled Christo and Jeanne-Claude: Barrels and The Mastaba 1958–2018. The exhibition comprised sculptures, drawings, collages, scale-models and photographs from the last 60 years of the artists' work.

Another Mastaba of over 400,000 oil barrels is intended to be built at Al Gharbia, 160 km (100 mi) from the city Abu Dhabi.

=== Over the River ===
Christo and Jeanne-Claude announced plans for a future project, titled Over The River, to be constructed on the Arkansas River between Salida, Colorado, and Cañon City, Colorado, on the eastern slope of the Rocky mountains. Plans for the project call for horizontally suspending 10.8 km (6.7 mi) of reflective, translucent fabric panels high above the water, on steel cables anchored into the river's banks. Project plans called for its installation for two weeks during the summer of 2015, at the earliest, and for the river to remain open to recreation during the installation. Reaction among area residents was intense, with supporters hoping for a tourist boom and opponents fearing that the project would ruin the visual appeal of the landscape and inflict damage on the river ecosystem. One local rafting guide compared the project to "hanging pornography in a church." The U.S. Bureau of Land Management released a Record of Decision approving the project on November 7, 2011. Work on the project cannot begin, however, until the Bureau of Land Management issues a Notice to Proceed. A lawsuit against Colorado Parks and Wildlife was filed on July 22, 2011, by Rags Over the Arkansas River (ROAR), a local group opposed to the project. The lawsuit is still awaiting a court date.

Christo and Jeanne-Claude's inspiration for Over the River came in 1985 as they were wrapping the Pont-Neuf and a fabric panel was being elevated over the Seine. The artists began a three-year search for appropriate locations in 1992, considering some eighty-nine river locations. They chose the Arkansas River because its banks were high enough that recreational rafters could enjoy the river at the same time.

Christo and Jeanne-Claude spent more than $6 million on environmental studies, design engineering, and wind tunnel testing of fabrics. As with past projects, Over The River would be financed entirely by Christo and Jeanne-Claude, through the sale of Christo's preparatory drawings, collages, scale models, and early works of the 1950s/1960s. On July 16, 2010, the U.S. Bureau of Land Management released its four-volume Draft Environmental Impact Statement, which reported many potentially serious types of adverse impact but also many proposed "mitigation" options.

In January 2017, after the election of President Trump, Christo canceled the controversial project citing protest of the new administration as well as tiring from the hard-fought legal battle waged by local residents.

=== L'Arc de Triomphe, Wrapped ===
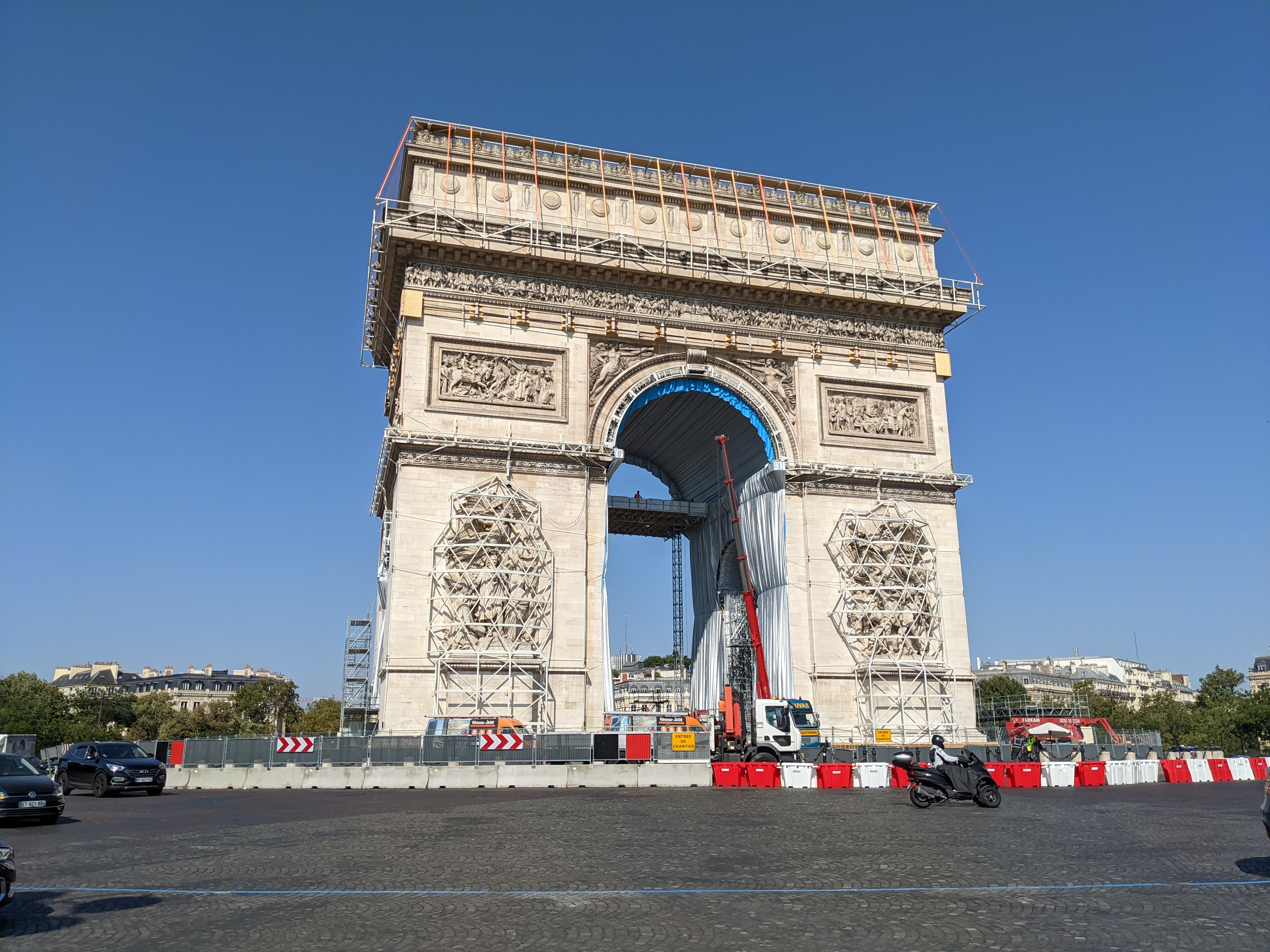
Arc de Triomphe being prepared for Christo wrapping

Continuing their series of monumental "wrapping" projects, the Arc de Triomphe in Paris was wrapped in 30,000 square meters of recyclable polypropylene fabric in silvery blue, and 7,000 meters (23,000 feet) of red rope. Originally scheduled for autumn of 2020, it was postponed a year to Saturday, September 18 to Sunday, October 3, 2021, due to the COVID-19 pandemic in France and its impact on the arts and cultural sector worldwide. Following Christo's death, his office stated that the project would nevertheless be completed.

Several articles in the press cut the name of Jeanne-Claude on their coverage of the event leading to a debate about the suppression of the place of women in art history.

== Reception ==
Christo and Jeanne-Claude's work is held by many major public collections. The artists received the 1995 Praemium Imperiale, the 2006 Vilcek Prize, and the 2004 International Sculpture Center's Lifetime Achievement in Contemporary Sculpture Award.

Art critic David Bourdon described Christo's wrappings as a "revelation through concealment". Unto his critics Christo replied, "I am an artist, and I have to have courage ... Do you know that I don't have any artworks that exist? They all go away when they're finished. Only the preparatory drawings, and collages are left, giving my works an almost legendary character. I think it takes much greater courage to create things to be gone than to create things that will remain." Jeanne-Claude was a firm believer in the aesthetic beauty of works of art; she said, "'We want to create works of art of joy and beauty, which we will build because we believe it will be beautiful.'"

In 2022, the Pérez Art Museum Miami presented Christo Drawings: A Gift from the Maria Bechily and Scott Hodes Collection, comprising drawings and project sketches produced by Christo and his life partner and artistic collaborator Jeane-Claude between the 1960s and the 2000s.

== Biographies ==
Jeanne-Claude and Christo were born on the same day in 1935; Jeanne-Claude in Morocco and Christo in Bulgaria. Christo outlived Jeanne-Claude by ten-and-a-half years.

=== Christo ===
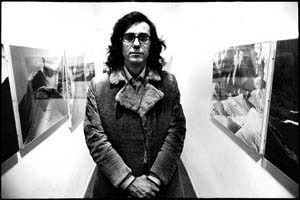
Young Christo

Christo's signature

Christo Vladimirov Javacheff (Bulgarian: Христо Владимиров Явашев, [xrisˈtɔ vlɐˈdimirof jaˈvaʃɛf]) was born on June 13, 1935, in Gabrovo, Bulgaria, as the second of three sons to Tzveta Dimitrova, a Macedonian Bulgarian from Thessaloniki, and Vladimir Javacheff, who worked at a textile manufacturer. Christo was shy and had a predilection for art. He received private art instruction at a young age and the support of his parents, who invited visiting artists to their house. Christo was particularly affected by events from World War II and the country's fluid borders. During evacuations, he and his brothers stayed with a family in the rural hills outside town, where Christo connected with nature and handicraft.

Christo pursued realistic painting through the mid-1950s, a period during which Western art was suppressed in Bulgaria. He was admitted into the Sofia Academy of Fine Arts in 1953 but found the school dull and stifling. Instead, he found inspiration in Skira art books, and visiting Russian professors who were older than him and once active in Russian modernism and the Soviet avant-garde. On the weekends, academy students were sent to paint propaganda and Christo unhappily participated. He found work as a location scout for the state cinema and served three tours of duty during summer breaks. In 1956, he used an academy connection to receive permission to visit family in Prague, where the theater of Emil František Burian reinvigorated him. Amid fears of further Russian suppression in Hungary, Christo decided to flee to Vienna as a railcar stowaway. He had little money after paying the bribe, did not speak the language, had deserted during his Bulgarian military service, and feared being trapped in a refugee camp.

In Vienna, he stayed with a family friend (who had not expected him), studied at the Vienna Fine Arts Academy, and surrendered his passport to seek political asylum as a stateless person. There, he supported himself with commissions and briefly visited Italy with the academy, whose program he found equally unhappy as the one before it. At the behest of a friend relocated from Sofia, he saved up to visit Geneva in late 1957. In violation of his visa, he continued to pursue commissions (whose works he would sign with his family name, reserving his given name for more serious work) and was transformed after visiting the Kunstmuseum Basel and Kunsthaus Zürich. In January 1958, he first began to wrap things, as would become his trademark, starting with a paint can. His collection of wrapped household items would be known as his Inventory. In February 1958, Christo left for Paris, having received a visa with the assistance of a Sofia academy connection.

In 1973, after 17 stateless years, Christo became a United States citizen. He died at his home in New York City on May 31, 2020, at 84. No cause of death was specified. L'Arc de Triomphe, Wrapped, a planned work by Christo and Jeanne-Claude, went ahead posthumously in Paris in September 2021.

=== Jeanne-Claude ===
Jeanne-Claude Denat de Guillebon (French: [ʒan klod dəna də gijəbɔ̃]) was born in Casablanca, Morocco, where her father, an army officer, was stationed. Her mother, Précilda, was 17 when she married Jeanne-Claude's father, Major Léon Denat. Précilda and Léon Denat divorced shortly after Jeanne-Claude was born, and Précilda remarried three times. Jeanne-Claude earned a baccalauréat in Latin and philosophy in 1952 from the University of Tunis. After Précilda married the General Jacques de Guillebon in 1947, the family lived in Bern (1948–1951) and Tunisia (1952–1957) before returning to Paris.

Jeanne-Claude was described as "extroverted" and with natural organizational abilities. Her hair was dyed red, which she claimed was selected by her husband. She took responsibility for overseeing work crews and for raising funds.

Jeanne-Claude died in New York City on November 18, 2009, from complications due to a brain aneurysm. Her body was to be donated to science, one of her final wishes. When she died, she and Christo were at work on Over the River and the United Arab Emirates project, The Mastaba. She said, "Artists don't retire. They die. That's all. When they stop being able to create art, they die."

=== Marriage ===
Christo and Jeanne-Claude met in October 1958 when he was commissioned to paint a portrait of her mother, Précilda de Guillebon. Initially, Christo was attracted to Jeanne-Claude's half-sister, Joyce. Jeanne-Claude was engaged to Philippe Planchon. Shortly before her wedding, Jeanne-Claude became pregnant by Christo. Although she married Planchon, Jeanne-Claude left him immediately after their honeymoon. Christo and Jeanne-Claude's son, Cyril, was born on May 11, 1960.

== See also ==
- Land art

== Bibliography ==
- Baal-Teshuva, Jacob (2001) [1995]. Christo and Jeanne-Claude. Cologne, Germany: Taschen.
- Chernow, Burt (2002). Christo and Jeanne-Claude: A Biography. Macmillan. ISBN 978-0-312-28074-1.
- Fineberg, Jonathan David (2004). Christo and Jeanne-Claude: On the Way to The Gates, Central Park, New York City. Yale University Press. ISBN 978-0-300-10405-9.
- This article is based on a translation of the corresponding article from the German Wikipedia, accessed on May 3, 2005, with additional material on the Over the River project from the artists' website and newspapers.
