= Cyril Christo =

American writer, poet, photographer, filmmaker and animal rights activist (born 1960)

- Born: May 11, 1960 (age 66); Paris, France
- Education: Columbia University
- Occupations: Writer, producer, poet, filmmaker, animal rights activist
- Known for: A Stitch for Time
- Notable work: Lords of the Earth: The Entwined Destiny of Wildlife and Humanity
- Spouse: Marie Wilkinson
- Children: Lysander Christo
- Parent: Christo Vladimirov Javacheff and Jeanne-Claude Denat de Guillebon (aka Christo and Jeanne-Claude)

Cyril Christo (born 11 May 1960, Paris, France) is a writer, poet, photographer, filmmaker and animal rights activist residing in Santa Fe, New Mexico. He has created or co-created a number of poetry and photography books that include Lost Africa: The Eyes of Origin, Walking Thunder: In the Footsteps of the African Elephant, and In Predatory Light: In Search of Lions, Tigers and Polar Bears.

He is the son of Christo Vladimirov Javacheff and Jeanne-Claude Denat de Guillebon, who are known as the artists Christo and Jeanne-Claude. Since 1997 he frequently works on films and books with his wife, Marie Wilkinson, and occasionally too with his son Lysander. The three of them worked with Jane Goodall on the book Lords of the Earth: The Entwined Destiny of Wildlife and Humanity. Christo and Wilkinson's first book of black and white photography, Lost Africa: The Eyes of Origin, published by Assouline Publishing in 2005, focused on ecological and man-made troubles that face tribal communities in the Horn of Africa. Photographs from that project were also published.

== Early life and education ==
Christo was born in France and has lived in the United States since the age of four, when his family moved there in 1964. Christo studied at Cornell University and graduated from Columbia University in 1982.

== Film work ==
Together with his wife Mary Wilkinson he has been engaged since 1996 in wildlife documentary projects and has published several photography books about Africa that call attention to endangered animals such as elephants, leopards, giraffes, and lions. as well as appeals for more stricter measures to enforce the protection of whales and polar bears.

Their son Lysander (born 22 September 2005) has participated in their projects in East Africa from an early age. In 2007 they released a short documentary film titled Lysander's Song about the interactions between humans and elephants.

Cyril Christo is the co-producer of A Stitch for Time: The Boise Peace Quilt Project, which was nominated in 1998 for an Academy Award for Best Documentary Feature. The film documents activities of a group of quilt makers in Boise, Idaho, who received international attention for promoting peace by sending a quilt in 1981 to the Soviet Union as well as making the National Peace Quilt in 1986 for display in the United States Senate and later deposit at the Smithsonian Institution.

The film Walking Thunder: Ode to the African Elephant about Lysander's encounter with elephants in East Africa was screened at the 2019 Taos Environmental Film Festival.

== Book publications ==
- 1990: The Dream of the Earth. Edwin Mellen Press, Lewiston. (Book of Poems) ISBN 088946846X
- 1990: The Iguana at the Millenium: Poems: 14. Edwin Mellen Press, Lewiston. (Book of Poems) ISBN 0889468451
- 1993: Christo: The Reichstag and Urban Projects. (Contributor) ISBN 3791313231
- 1997: Hiroshima, My Love (Epic poem on the theme of Hiroshima) ISBN 0773428194
- 1998: Whispering Veils : Poems on Christo's Art. Hugh Lauter Levin Associates, New York. ISBN 0883630230
- 1998: The Twilight Language, Canios Editions. ISBN 1886435057
- 2004: Lost Africa: Eyes of Origin. Assouline, New York City. (with Marie Wilkinson ISBN 284323607X
- 2004: Africa : la terre des origines. (in French) ISBN 2843236436
- 2009: Walking Thunder: In the Footsteps of the African Elephant. Merrell, London. ISBN 1858945054
- 2013: In Predatory Light: Lions and Tigers and Polar Bears. Merrell, London. (with Marie Wilkinson) ISBN 1858946107
- 2022: Lords of the Earth: The Entwined Destiny of Wildlife and Humanity. (with Marie Wilkinson and Lysander Christo, prologue by Jane Goodall) ISBN 3862069443
- 2024: Wonder and the World: A Childhood Among the Species. Verlag Kettler. (with Marie Wilkinson and Lysander Christo) ISBN 3987410795
