= A Stitch for Time =

1987 film

- Directed by: Nigel Noble
- Produced by: Cyril Christo; Barbara Herbich
- Distributed by: Direct Cinema
- Release date: 1987
- Country: United States
- Language: English

A Stitch for Time is a 1987 documentary film directed by Nigel Noble. The film documents the making of the National Peace Quilt.

== Background ==
Following the footsteps of those from the American Civil War and both World Wars, quiltmakers during the Cold War made quilts related to the conflict. Conceived in the early 80s, it began with one quilt expressing solidarity with Soviet women against nuclear proliferation and believed that they were a less abrasive way to encourage peace and piece together alienated societies.

== Reception ==
It was nominated for an Academy Award for Best Documentary Feature.

== See also ==
- Common Threads: Stories from the Quilt-1989 Oscar-winning documentary about the NAMES Project AIDS Memorial Quilt
- Soviet Union-United States relations
