= The Umbrellas (Christo and Jeanne-Claude) =

Environmental artwork

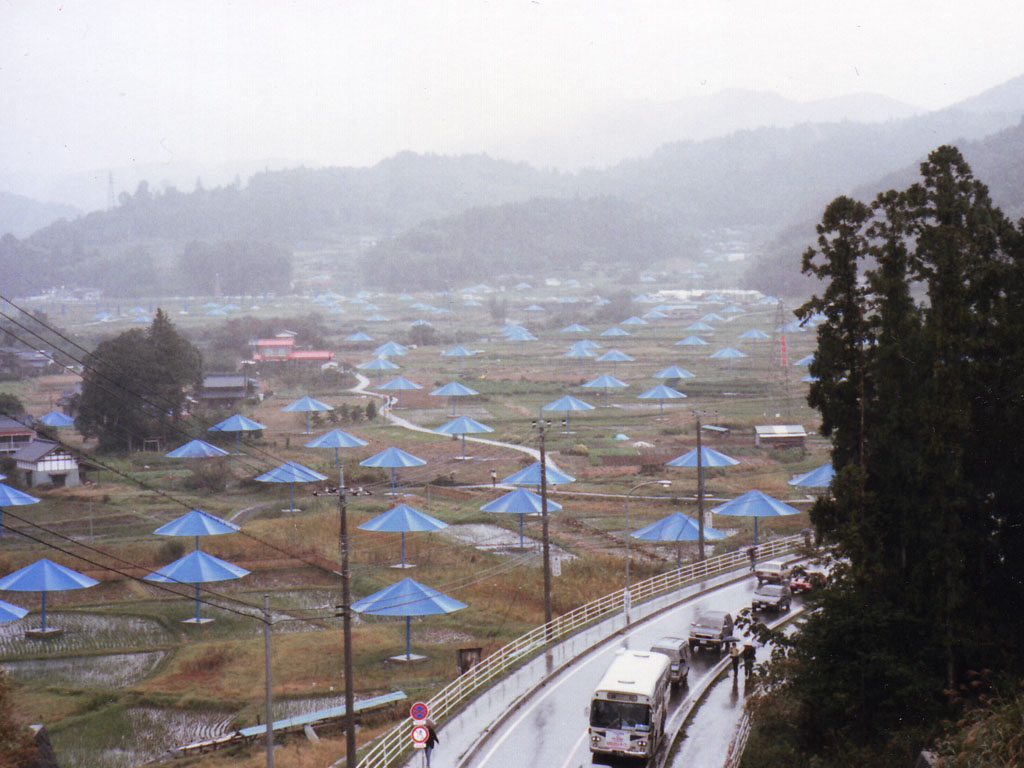
The Umbrellas, 1991, Japan

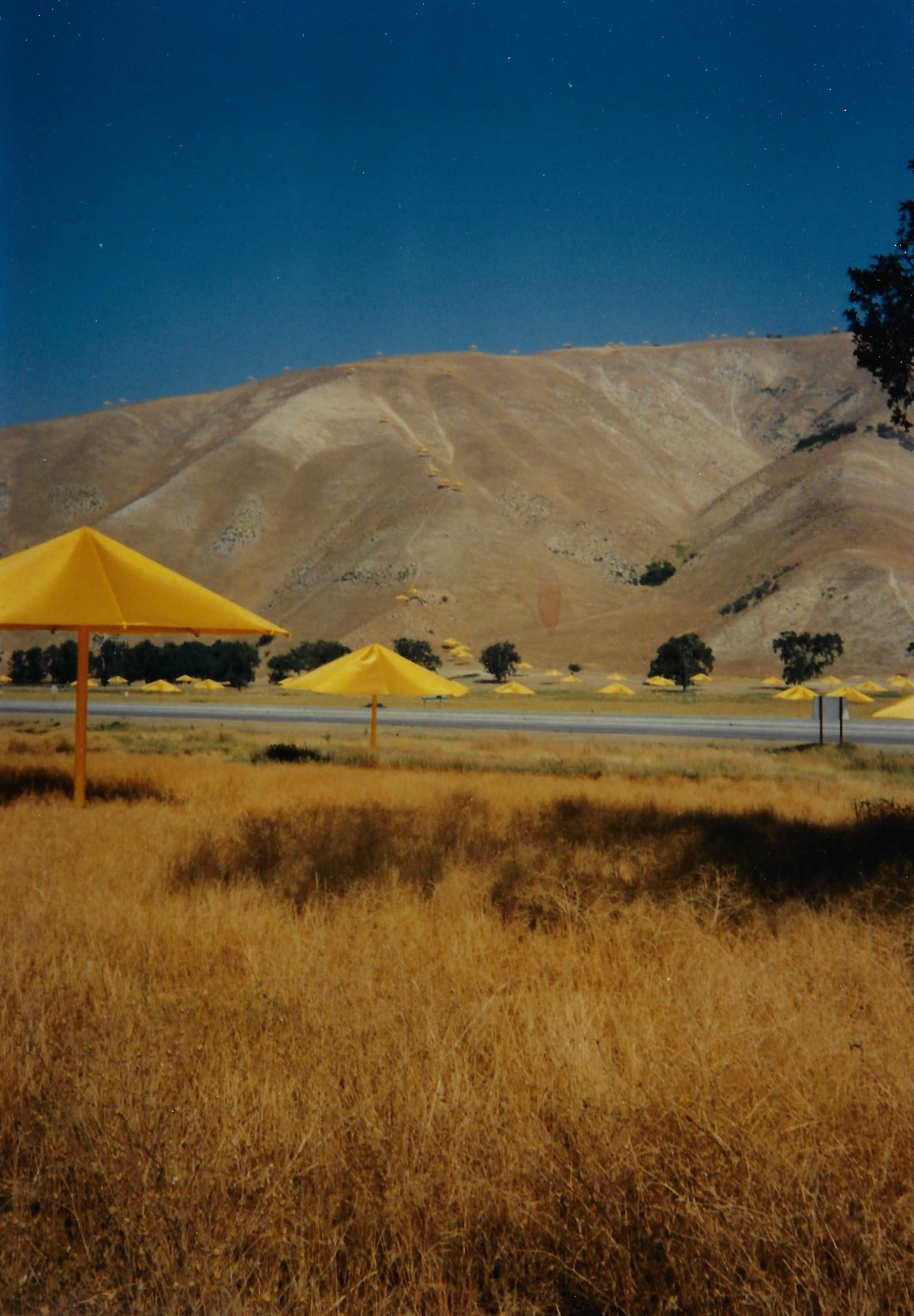
Photograph of the yellow umbrellas of the 1991 Christo and Jeanne-Claude project in California. Photo by Robert S. McCombs.

The Umbrellas, Japan–USA, 1984–91 was a 1991 environmental artwork in which artists Christo and Jeanne-Claude erected yellow and blue umbrella structures in California (between Gorman and Grapevine) and Japan, respectively. The 3,100-umbrella project cost US$26 million and attracted three million visitors. Christo closed the exhibition early after a woman was crushed by a windswept umbrella in California. Separately, a worker was killed during the deconstruction of the Japanese exhibit.

== Bibliography ==
- Baal-Teshuva, Jacob (2001). Christo and Jeanne-Claude. Taschen. ISBN 978-3-8228-5996-4.
- Chernow, Burt (2002). Christo and Jeanne-Claude: A Biography. Macmillan. ISBN 978-0-312-28074-1.
- Chianese, Robert Louis (2013). "How Green Is Earth Art? The Umbrellas". American Scientist. 101 (2): 108–109. doi:10.1511/2013.101.108. ISSN 0003-0996. JSTOR 43707009.
- Findlay, Robert; Walterscheid, Ellen (1993). "Christo's Umbrellas: Visual Art/Performance/Ritual/Real Life on a Grand Scale". TDR. 37 (1): 74–97. doi:10.2307/1146272. ISSN 1054-2043. JSTOR 1146272.
- Fineberg, Jonathan David (2004). "The Umbrellas". Christo and Jeanne-Claude: On the Way to The Gates, Central Park, New York City. Yale University Press. pp. 44–47. ISBN 978-0-300-10405-9.
- Hall, Carla (November 1, 1991). "Second Death from Christo's Umbrellas". Washington Post. ISSN 0190-8286.
