= The Gates =

Art installation by Christo and Jeanne-Claude

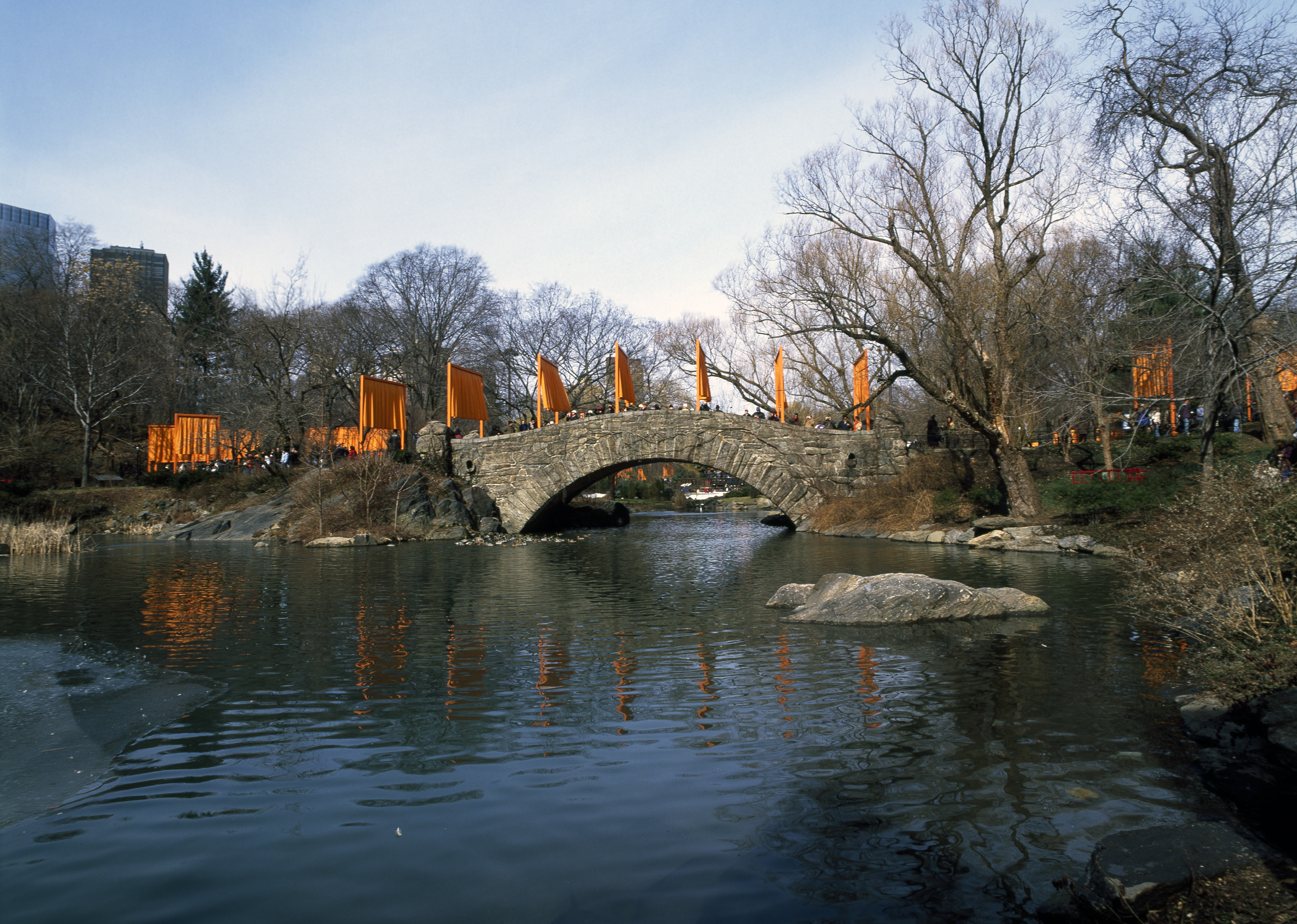
- The installation over Gapstow Bridge in Central Park, New York City
- Artist: Christo and Jeanne-Claude
- Completion date: 12 February 2005
- Type: Site-specific art
- Condition: Dismantled
- Location: Central Park, New York City, U.S.
- Website: The Gates

The Gates was a site-specific work of art by Bulgarian artist Christo Yavacheff and French artist Jeanne-Claude, known jointly as Christo and Jeanne-Claude. The artists installed 7,503 steel "gates" along 23 miles (37 km) of pathways in Central Park in New York City. From each gate hung a panel of deep saffron-colored nylon fabric. The exhibit ran from February 12 through February 27, 2005.

In the books and other memorabilia distributed by the artists, the project is called The Gates, Central Park, New York, 1979–2005, alluding to the time that passed between the artists' initial proposal and its installation.

The Gates was greeted with mixed reactions. Some people loved the work for brightening the bleak winter landscape and encouraging late-night pedestrian traffic in Central Park; others hated it, accusing the artists of defacing the landscape. It was seen as an obstruction to bicyclists, who felt that the gates could cause accidents, although cycling was not legal on those paths. The artists received a great deal of their nationwide fame as a frequent object of ridicule by David Letterman (television talk-show host), as well as by Keith Olbermann (television journalist), whose apartment was nearby.

== Fabrication ==
=== Construction and cost ===
According to the artists, the work used 5,390 tons of steel, 315,491 feet (96 km) of vinyl tubing, 99,155 square metres of fabric, and 15,000 sets of brackets and hardware. The textile was produced and sewn in Germany. The gates were assembled in a 25,000-square-foot (2,300 m²) Long Island facility, then trucked to Central Park. The steel was machined at the Charles C. Lewis Steel Company in Springfield, MA.

As one of the conditions for use of the park space, the steel bases rested upon the walkways, but were unattached to them, so that no holes were drilled and no permanent changes were made to the park.

The artists sold pieces of their own artwork, including preparatory drawings for The Gates, to finance the project.

The artists said the project cost of $21 million. But Greg Allen and The New York Times attempted to itemize the costs and could account for about $5–10 million, given reasonable estimates for parts, labor, and costs related to the staffing of the installation.

=== Installation ===
Installation began on February 13, 2004. During the week of March 17, Central Park filled with workers using forklifts to move the rectangular steel plates into position. Small signs with alphanumeric codes along the park's walkways guided the placement of each piece.

By April 10, most of the rectangular metal plates were positioned. All had small orange plastic markers sticking up two feet (around half a meter) from each end, possibly intended to help people find the base plates if they were covered with snow. Progress was hampered in early 2005 by a major snowstorm on January 22 and extreme cold.

On February 7, 2005, more than 100 teams of eight workers, all wearing grey uniform smocks, began erecting the gates and bolting them to the base plates. The artists specified the color as saffron but many local observers described it as orange. The fabric hung from the crossbars at the top, 16 feet (5 m) high, from which it was unfurled on opening day, February 12. The most common width seems to have been 11 feet (3 m) although the width varied, depending on the width of the path, from 5 feet 6 inches to 18 feet.

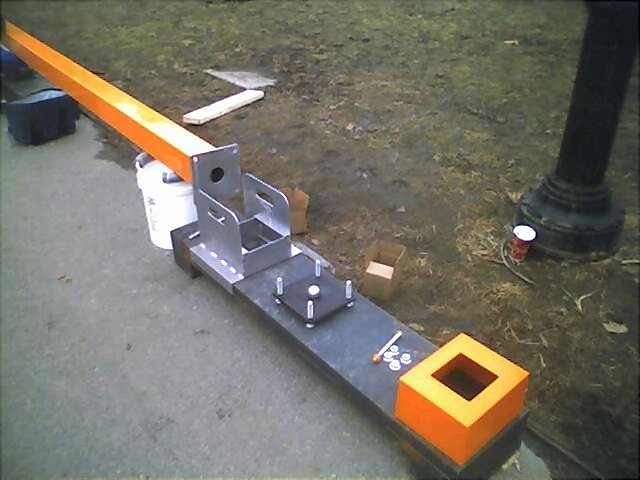
Hardware used to ensure that the vertical pieces were parallel, even when the base plates themselves were not level, due to uneven or sloped ground

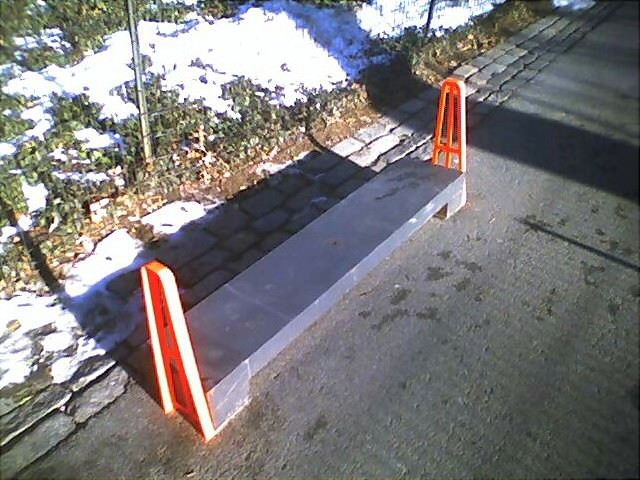
During construction: one of the many metal base parts

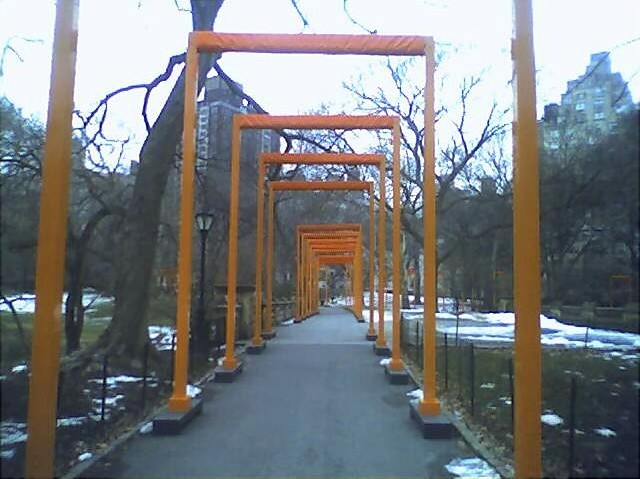
Before unfurling

== Display ==
=== Opening ===
The project was officially launched on February 12, 2005, when then-New York Mayor Michael R. Bloomberg dropped the first piece of fabric at 8:30 a.m., with Christo and Jeanne-Claude in attendance. The rest of The Gates were opened subsequently throughout the park and were completed within the next few hours with large crowds of people watching. Generally, the crews of workers who erected the gates were assigned to open them. They walked underneath, and used a hook at the end of a long stick to pull a loop hanging from the crossbar of each gate. That opened the cloth bag containing the fabric panel part of the gate. The bag fell to the ground, along with a cardboard tube around which the fabric was rolled. The fabric part then hung from the horizontal crossbar. By the afternoon of February 12, all of the panels were unfurled.

The project staff remained deployed in the park, patrolling, and replacing damaged gates. On many days, staff members distributed free 2.75" square souvenir swatches of the orange fabric to passers by, in part intended to discourage vandalism. Nevertheless, one of the gates, near the Shakespeare Garden in front of the Delacorte Theatre, was vandalized and replaced frequently. The swatches remain highly collectible and trade on eBay for about $10 each.

=== Closure and legacy ===
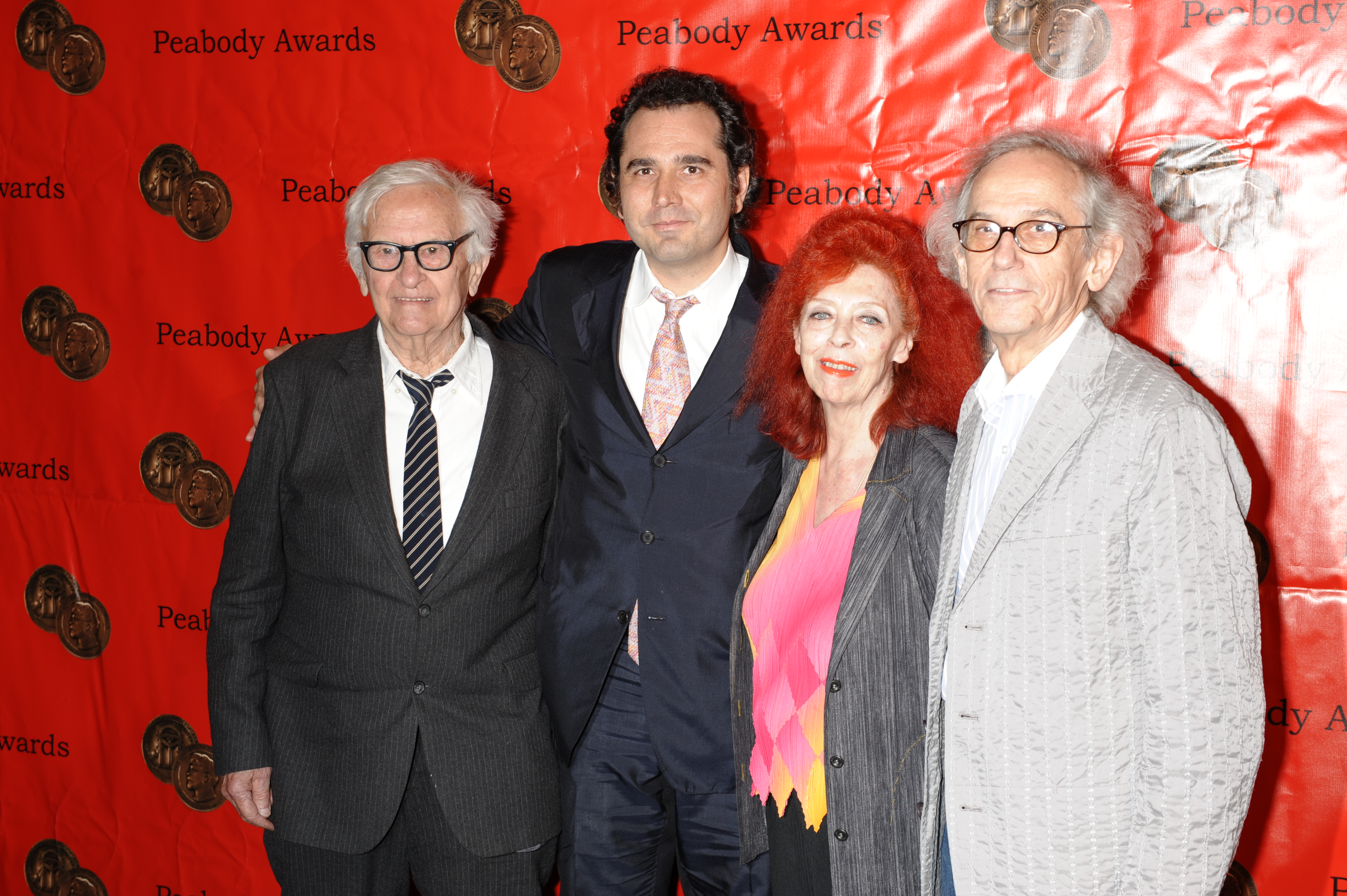
Al Maysles, Antonio Ferrera, Jeanne-Claude and Christo at the 6th Annual Peabody Awards for The Gates

The installation was set to close February 27, 2005. Christo and Jeanne-Claude also visited the installation on the last day, entering Central Park at its less congested northern end. Although the Park's roadways were closed to vehicles, they traveled with a police escort in their Maybach sedan. Christo then left the car and walked to several vantage points, capturing last minute photographs with a professional assistant. After the exhibition closed on February 27, the gates and bases were removed. The materials were industrially recycled, partially as scrap metal.

A 2007 documentary film's synopsis by the video's promoters, Kino Lorber, contend this artwork "brought over 4 million visitors from around the world to Central Park."

Albert Maysles's HBO movie The Gates, about the installation, aired February 26, 2008, won a Peabody Award that same year.

The science fiction movie Marjorie Prime features a fragmented memory from the female lead, Marjorie, about her experience of sitting on a park bench during this installation.

==== Inspirations ====
The Gates alludes to the tradition of Japanese torii gates, traditionally constructed at the entrance to Shinto shrines. Thousands of vermilion-colored torii line the paths of the Fushimi Inari shrine in Kyoto, Japan. Successful Japanese businessmen traditionally purchased a gate in gratitude to Inari, the god of worldly prosperity.

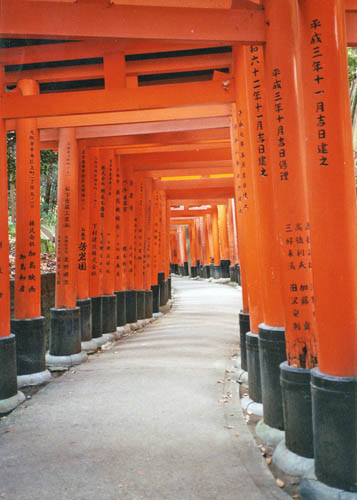
Fushimi Inari Shrine, Kyoto, Japan

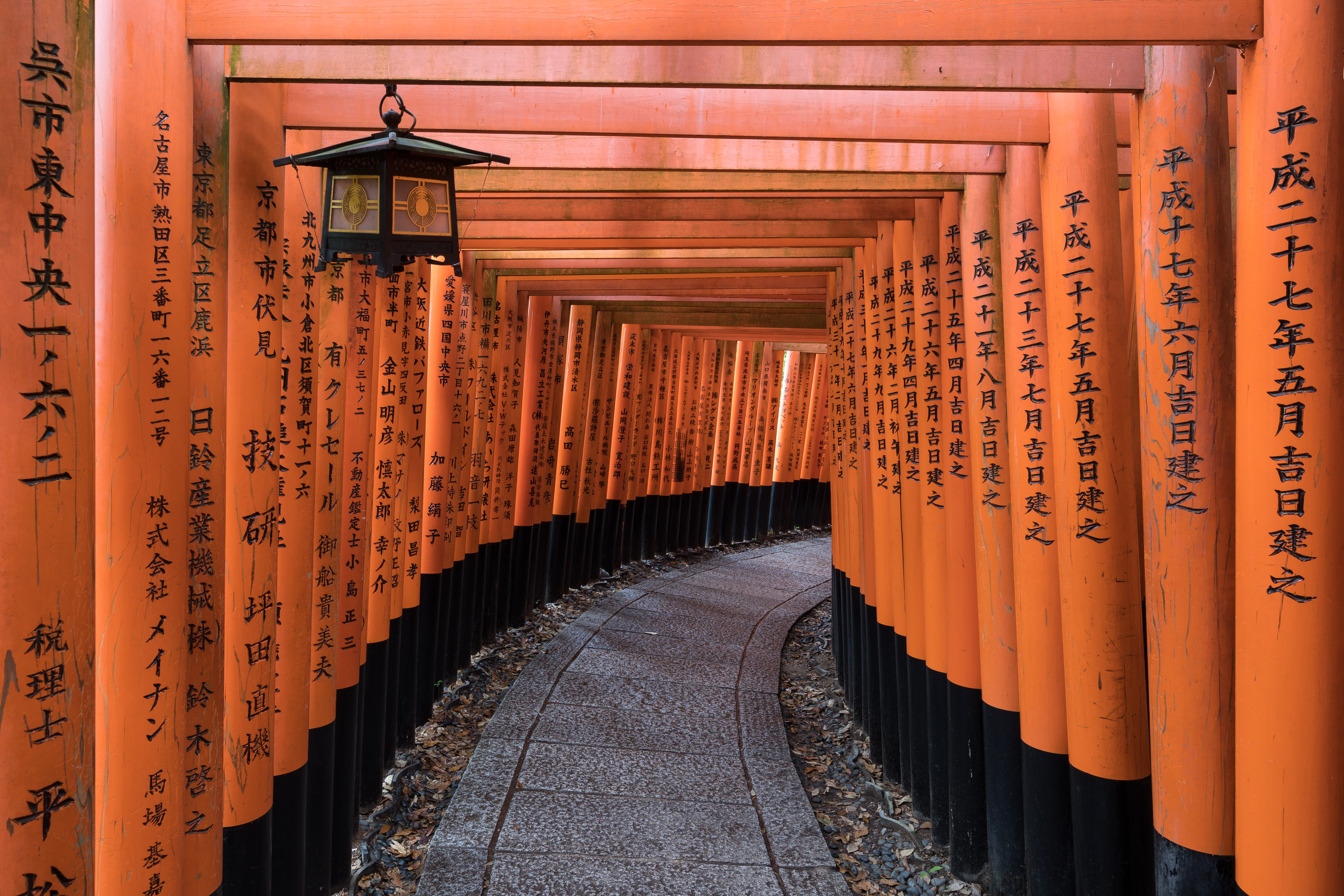
Thousands of torii gates line the paths of the celebrated Fushimi Inari Shrine in Kyoto, Japan

== Gallery ==
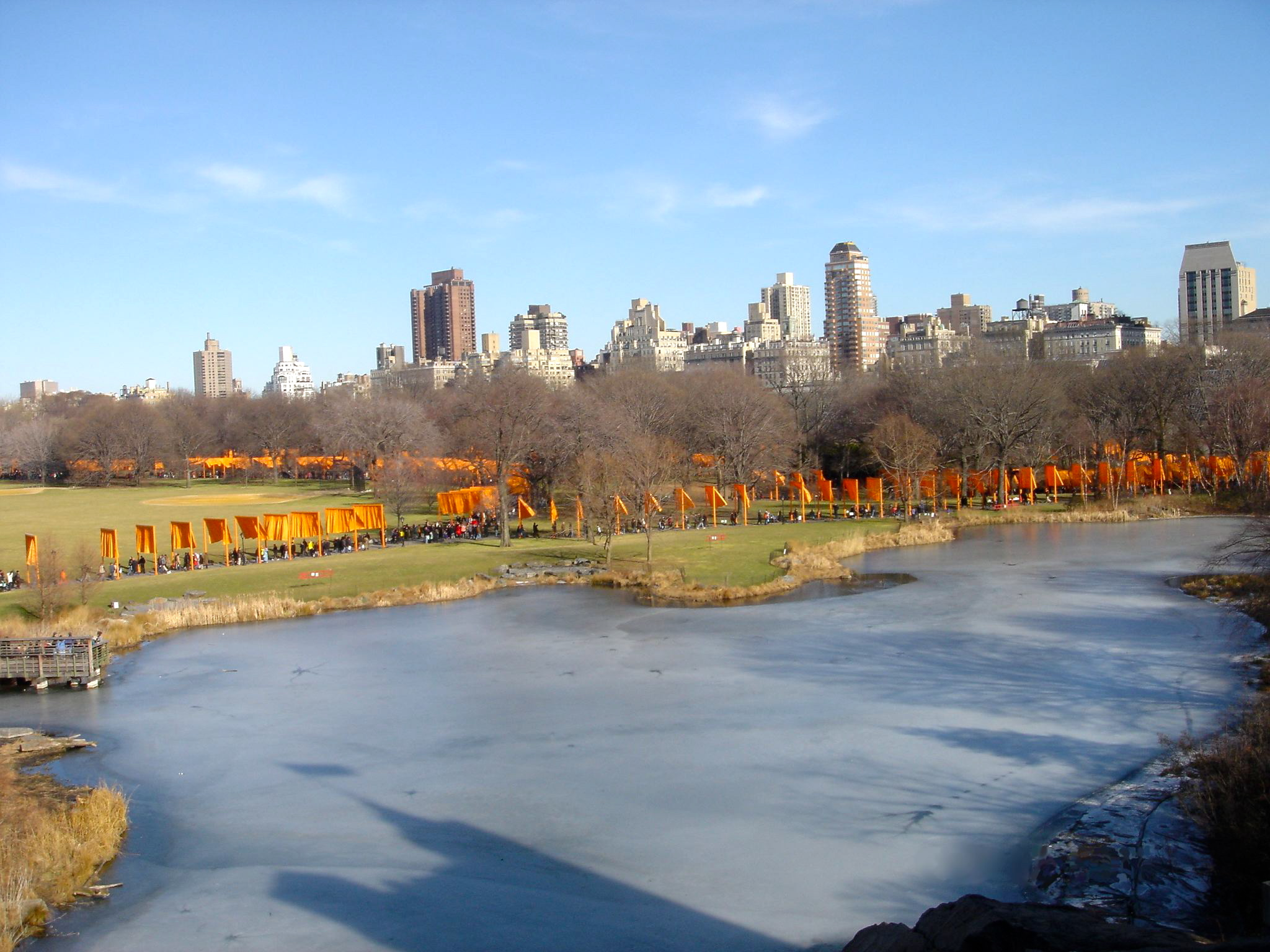
Facing northeast from Belvedere Castle

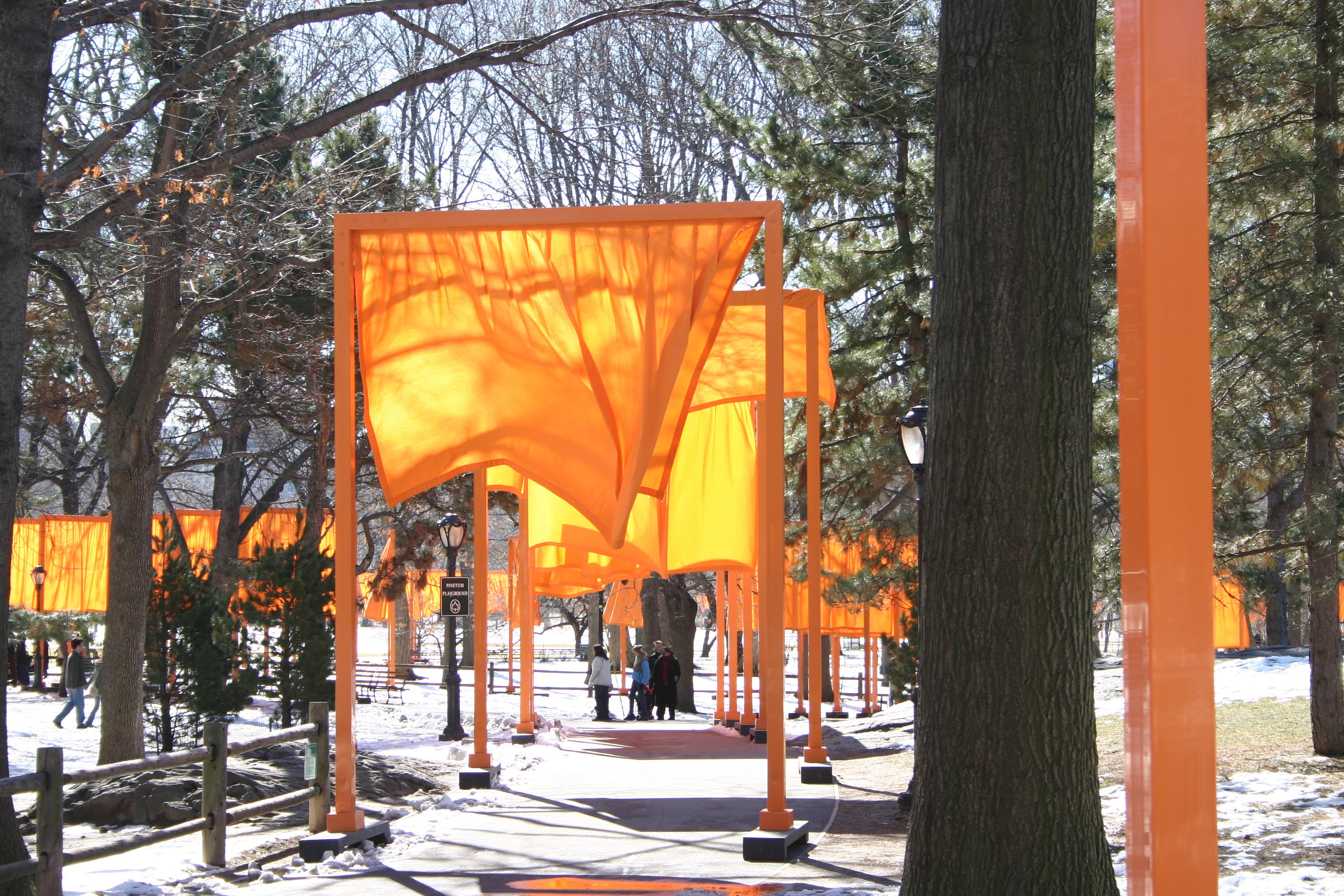
Facing east

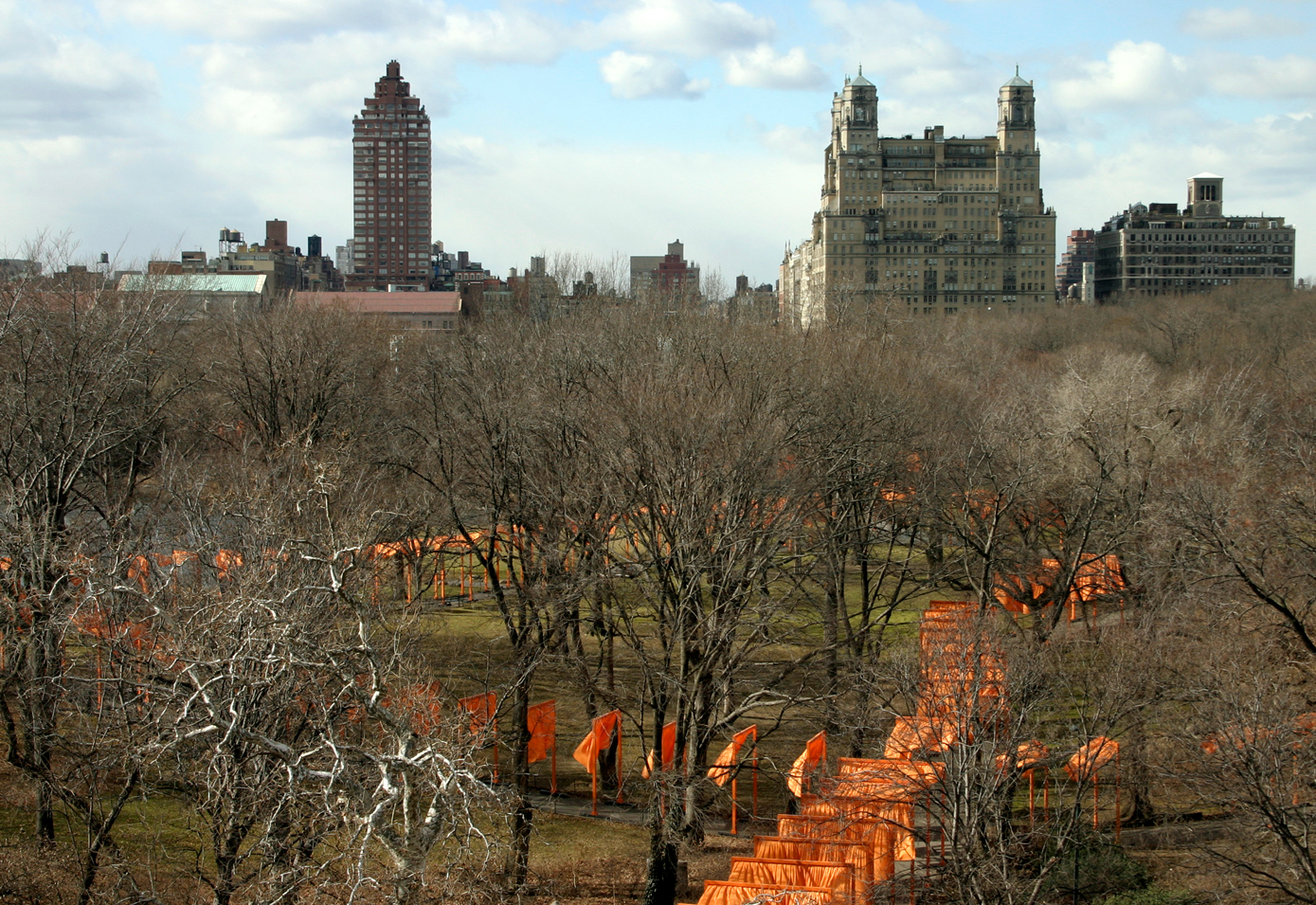
From the roof of the Metropolitan Museum of Art

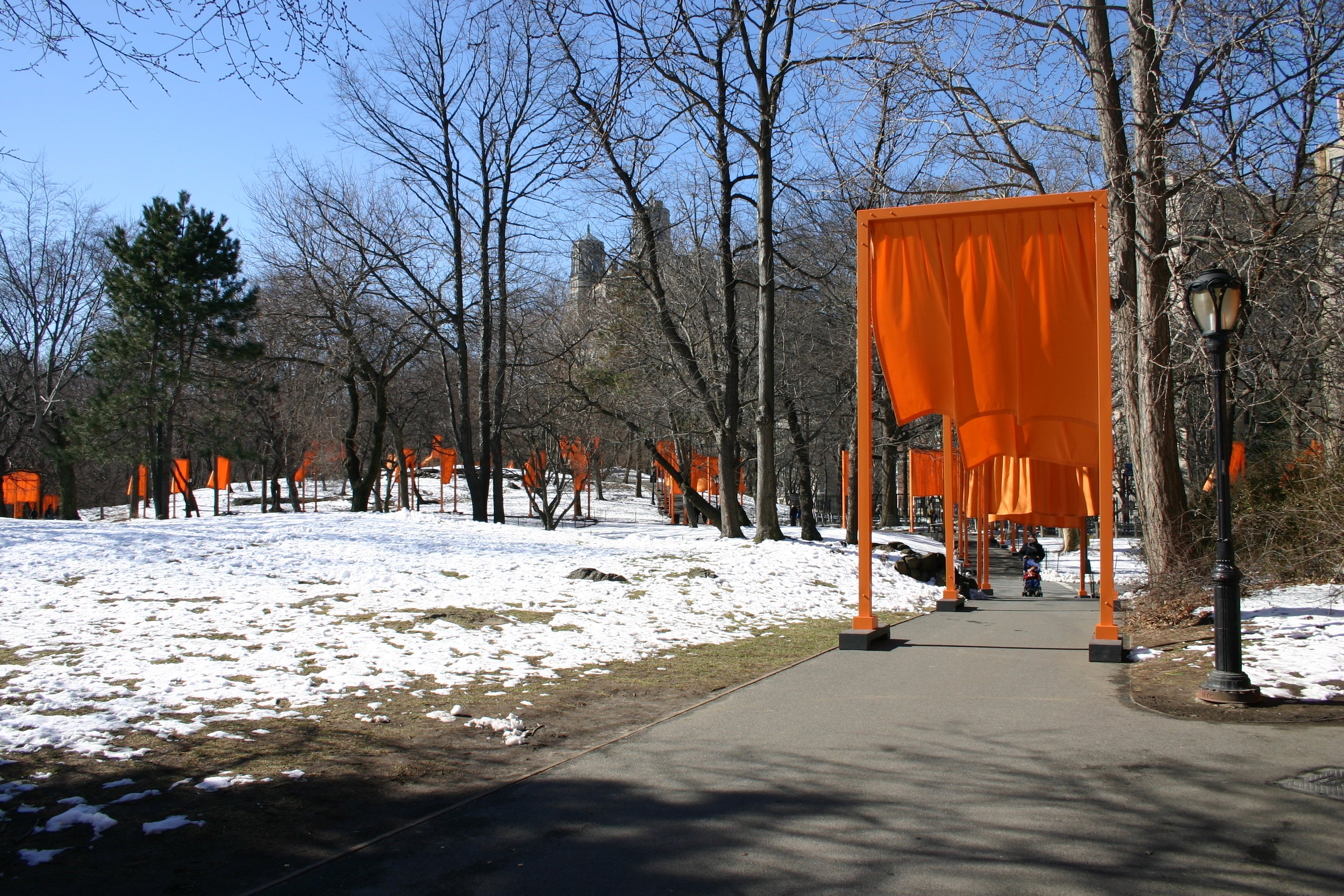
Facing southwest

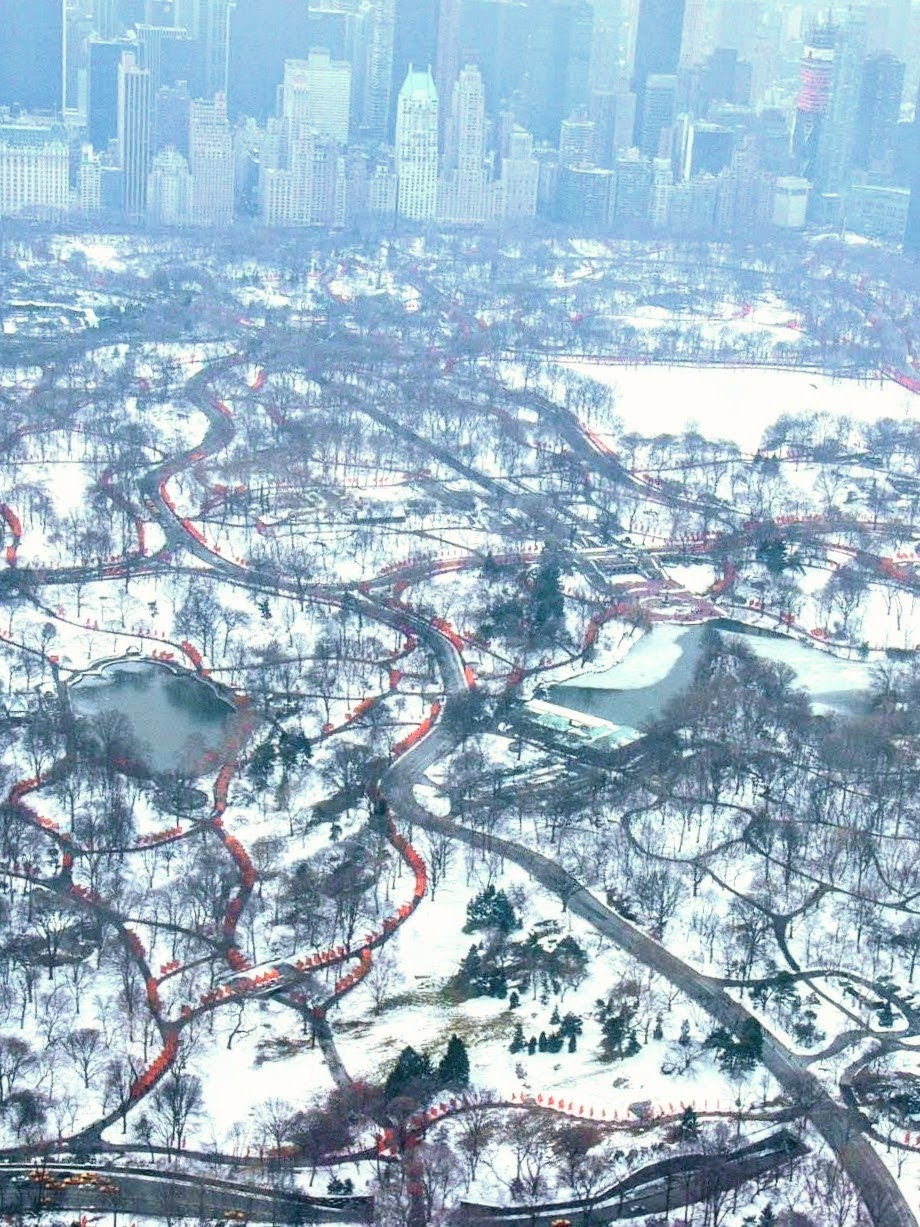
Aerial view of Central Park

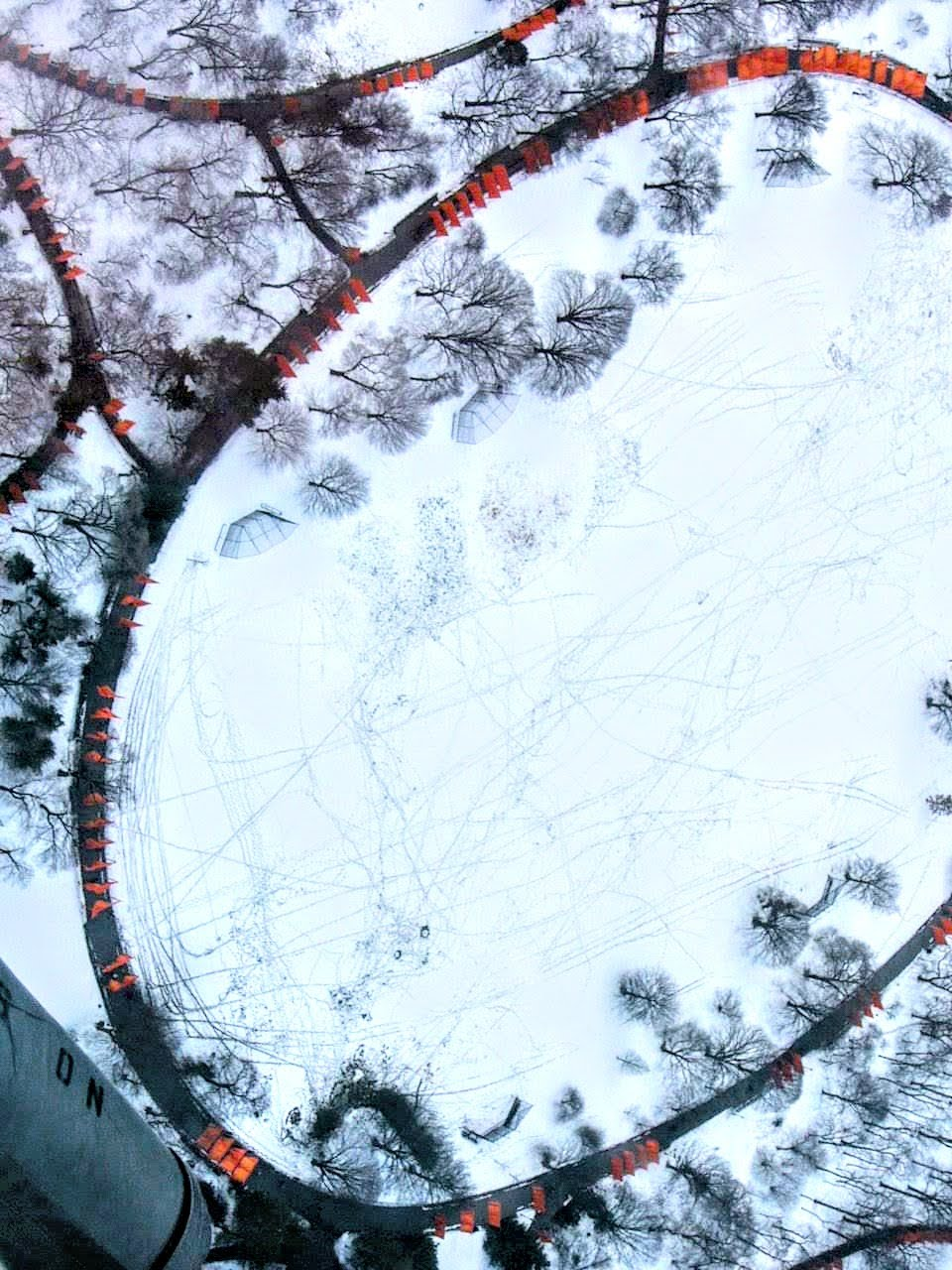
Aerial view of the Great Lawn
