= Wrapped Reichstag =

Environmental artwork

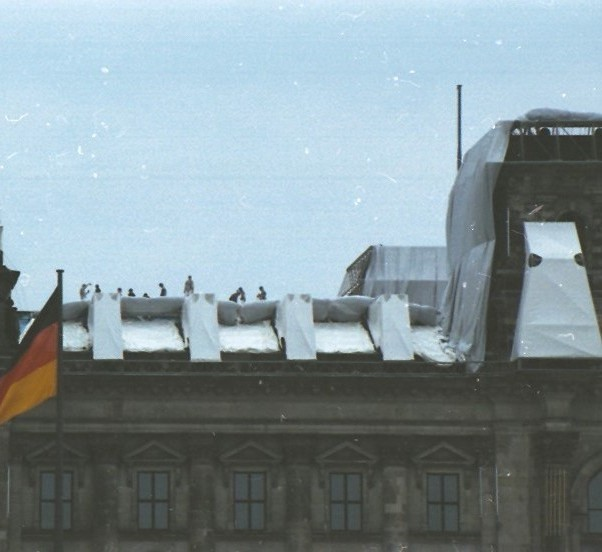
Workers preparing to drape the fabric

Wrapped Reichstag, Project for Berlin is a 1995 environmental artwork by artists Christo and Jeanne-Claude. The wrapped up Reichstag building is one of the most well-known public art projects. Aluminum-coated propylene was used for a wrapper.

== History ==
A German citizens' group had advocated unsuccessfully for the project in 1978. The focus on a building, which still held deep German national identity symbolism prior to reunification, would have required unavailable political will. In 1989 Rita Süssmuth, the newly elected President of the Bundestag, expressed interest in a project, that had been rejected three times across six Bundestag presidents over a period of 24 years. From 1991 onwards she supported the artist couple's plans giving them a concrete perspective for the first time. On 26 February 1994 the vote count at the Bundestag was 292 for and 223 votes against the project.

Wrapped Reichstag mounted in 1995 for two weeks as 100,000 square meters of the silvery looking fabric fastened with blue rope draped the building. The Reichstag, which had not been in legislative use since the ominous Reichstag fire of 1933, was later reconstructed for parliamentary use in 1999.

Christo described the Reichstag wrapping as autobiographical. The art project became symbolic of unified Germany and marked Berlin's return as a world city. The Guardian posthumously described the work as Christo's and Jeanne-Claude's "most spectacular achievement".

== Bibliography ==
- Artner, Alan G. (6 April 1986). "Christo Finds the Going Getting Rougher as He Wraps His Way Around the World". Chicago Tribune.
- Baal-Teshuva, Jacob (2001). Christo and Jeanne-Claude. Taschen. ISBN 978-3-8228-5996-4.
- Brockmann, Stephen (1999). "The Written Capital". Monatshefte. 91 (3): 376–395. ISSN 0026-9271. JSTOR 30159647.
- Chernow, Burt (2002). Christo and Jeanne-Claude: A Biography. Macmillan. ISBN 978-0-312-28074-1.
- da Silva, José (1 June 2020). "Christo and Jeanne-Claude's greatest hits". The Art Newspaper.
- Fineberg, Jonathan David (2004). "The Reichstag". Christo and Jeanne-Claude: On the Way to The Gates, Central Park, New York City. Yale University Press. pp. 48–50. ISBN 978-0-300-10405-9.
- Jelavich, Peter (1995). "The Wrapped Reichstag: From Political Symbol to Artistic Spectacle". German Politics & Society. 13 (4 (37)): 110–127. ISSN 1045-0300. JSTOR 23736267.
- Maier, Charles S. (1997). "Epilogue: Wrapped Reichstag, 1995". Dissolution. The Crisis of Communism and the End of East Germany. Princeton University Press. pp. 330–338. ISBN 978-0-691-00746-5. JSTOR j.ctt7sc5v.10.
- Needham, Alex (31 May 2020). "Christo, artist who wrapped the Reichstag, dies aged 84". The Guardian. ISSN 0261-3077.
- Rectanus, Mark W. (2002). "Sponsoring Events: Culture as Corporate Stage, from Woodstock to Ravestock and Reichstock". Culture Incorporated. Museums, Artists, and Corporate Sponsorships. University of Minnesota Press. pp. 132–168. ISBN 978-0-8166-3851-2. JSTOR 10.5749/j.ctttsbrx.9.
- Wainwright, Oliver (7 February 2017). "How we made the Wrapped Reichstag". The Guardian. ISSN 0261-3077.
- Warde-Aldam, Digby (19 June 2018). "Understanding Christo and Jeanne-Claude through 6 Pivotal Artworks". Artsy.
- Christo und Jeanne-Claude: Wrapped Reichstag. Berlin 1971–95. Taschen, Köln 2002, ISBN 3-8228-5504-9.
- Jacob Baal-Teshuva (Hrsg.): Christo, der Reichstag und urbane Projekte. Prestel, München 1993, ISBN 3-7913-1307-X.
- Jacob Baal-Teshuva: Christo & Jeanne-Claude, mit Fotografien von Wolfgang Volz, Benedikt Taschen Verlag, Köln 1995. ISBN 3-8228-8795-1.
- Burt Chernow: XTO + J-C. List, München 2002, ISBN 3-548-60158-8.
- Henning Ritter: Die Liebe der Massen zur Kunst. Christos Triumph. 1995. In: Die Wiederkehr der Wunderkammer. Über Kunst und Künstler, Hanser, Berlin 2014, S. 240–247.
