= The Pont Neuf Wrapped =

Environmental artwork

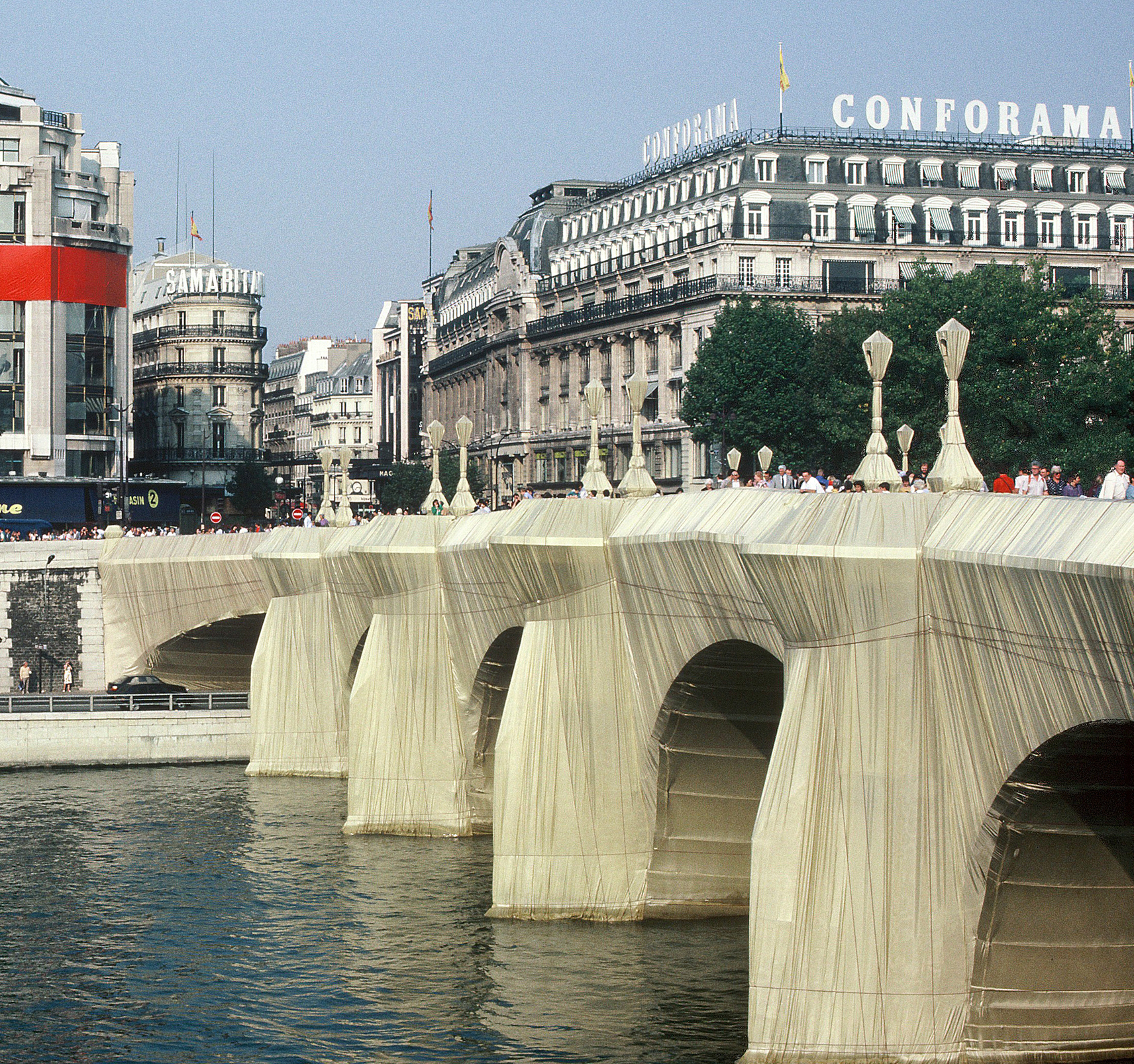
The wrapped bridge, September 1985

The Pont Neuf Wrapped, Paris, 1975–1985 (French: Le Pont Neuf emballé – Paris, 1975–1985) was a 1985 environmental artwork in which artists Christo and Jeanne-Claude wrapped the Pont Neuf in fabric. Planning for the project started in 1979. The artists put a model of the project in the window of La Samaritaine, a department store close to the bridge, in late 1981. Paris Mayor Jacques Chirac rejected the project in early 1982. An aide to the mayor snuck the permit approval into a pile of the mayor's papers, which he signed inadvertently in August 1984. When the mayor attempted to repeal the approval, Jeanne-Claude said she would show the press the letter as a symbol of his signature's worth, after which he dropped his case. In September 1985, the artists wrapped the bridge and its 44 streetlamps in a sandstone-colored fabric. The two-week installation attracted three million visitors. Christo and Jeanne-Claude financed the project themselves through the sale of preparatory drawings, collages, and scale models, declining all sponsorship as they did with their other works. Artsy described the response as "sensational". Irish sculptor Corban Walker credited seeing the wrapped bridge on a 1985 trip to Paris with inspiring him to become an artist.

== Bibliography ==
- Baal-Teshuva, Jacob (2001). Christo and Jeanne-Claude. Taschen. ISBN 978-3-8228-5996-4.
- Chernow, Burt (2002). Christo and Jeanne-Claude: A Biography. Macmillan. ISBN 978-0-312-28074-1.
- Fineberg, Jonathan David (2004). "The Pont Neuf Wrapped". Christo and Jeanne-Claude: On the Way to The Gates, Central Park, New York City. Yale University Press. pp. 42–43. ISBN 978-0-300-10405-9.
- Laroche-Signorile, Véronique (September 18, 2015). "Le 22 septembre 1985, Christo emballe le Pont-Neuf". Le Figaro.fr (in French).
- Salinger, Victoria (2007). The Pont Neuf Wrapped: Framing the Bridge, Bridging the Frame (Thesis).
