= Digital Information Center =

Library in Iraq

Digital information center
- 32°37′00″N 44°02′11″E
- Location: Karbala, Iraq, Iraq
- Type: Digital information center
- Established: 2007
- Branch of: Library of Al-Abbas Holy Shrine

Collection
- Size: Over 160,000 in general

Other information
- Employees: 14 employees as to 7th of May 2021
- Website: https://library.alkafeel.net/dic/

Digital Information Center is an online portal for the Library of Al-Abbas Holy Shrine in Iraq. It provides a variety of digital library resources and services to scientific communities, supporting the educational system in Iraq in and aligning with the demands of the scientific renaissance.

It was first established as a department in 2006 and was named the Electronic Library. In 2018, it underwent structural changes, transitioning from a single department to a center with multiple divisions that cover a wide spectrum of digital library services.

The Digital Information Center also contributes to preserving Iraqi scientific assets through digitization, preservation, and preparation through appropriate presentation means.

== Divisions ==
1. Information Management: This section is concerned with providing digital services and information sources available in the library to the beneficiaries, using advanced technical means to ensure optimal access to services and resources.
2. Data Processing: This section is concerned with the technical preparation of data, through its processing, organization, and archiving.
3. Information Technology: This section is concerned with studying, designing, developing, supporting, and activating information systems to achieve effective information retrieval.
4. Digital Lab: This section is concerned with digitizing paper sources and converting them into electronic texts while securing long-term storage means for them.

== Projects ==
=== Iraqi Scientific Assets Preservation ===
A national project concerned with providing protection and preservation of the Iraqi scientific heritage by digitizing scientific products according to international technical and standard specifications and by relying on Iraqi expertise and skills.

One of the most important reasons that prompted us to proceed with the completion of the project is the devastating wars that Iraq has gone through, and the accompanying destruction and loss of solid Iraqi scientific products, in addition to the damage these products are exposed to due to natural disasters such as fires and floods, or the impact of normal climatic factors on Paper and inks, especially when the appropriate environment for storage is not provided, as well as human factors such as theft or misuse of them.

=== Iraqi Digital Repository ===
After launching its platform experimentally on 21/7/2019, the features of the project, which took nearly three years to complete, after it was prepared (analysis, design, and programming) with 100% Iraqi hands and capabilities, with the support of the General Secretariat of the al-Abbas's (p) Holy Shrine and direct supervision from the digital information center of the al-Abbas library and updates are continuing to develop its services.

The idea of the project is to seek to collect theses and university theses in all scientific and humanitarian disciplines since the establishment of postgraduate studies in Iraqi universities, and include them in a comprehensive electronic directory, with standard specifications capable of updating, developing, and alignment with international programs based on Iraqi scientific and technical capabilities and energies.

The project aims at several goals, including:

- An attempt to limit the Iraqi academic scientific output represented by theses and university theses in one site that represents the scientific interface of Iraq.

- Recovering (as much as possible) what was lost from the theses and university theses as a result of the difficult conditions that Iraq went through.

- Preserving and documenting the intellectual output of postgraduate students at the university using long-term preservation media, which achieves the protection of assets from damage.

The most important services provided by the warehouse are:

Enabling Iraqi university professors and students to search the titles of Iraqi universities’ theses and dissertations, while providing access to the full texts of the theses and dissertations for their university and the universities participating with it.

- Enable researchers to search in the titles of Iraqi universities' theses and dissertations, while providing access to abstracts, indexes, and sources only.

- Verify the authenticity of the address to be written about by enabling objective citation for the titles of completed dissertations and dissertations in all Iraqi universities whose data is available in the repository. Conducting modern methods of electronically filing the thesis or thesis

== Services ==
=== E-lending service ===
Through this service, faculty members and graduate students in Iraqi universities can borrow the digital resources available in the al-Abbas's (p) Holy Shrine library and view them for a specified period.

=== Plagiarism Detection Service ===
This service is provided free of charge to know the percentage of looting that the Digital Information Center continues to provide since the year 2019 for the benefit of graduate students to know the percentage of looting in their research through the (turnitin) program approved by the Iraqi Ministry of Higher Education, before handing it over to their colleges and thus saving time and money

== International participation ==
The Center participated in several international and local forums, among which are:

1. The 84th World Conference on Libraries and Information, organized by the International Federation of Library Associations and Institutions (IFLA) in the Malaysian capital, under the slogan: (Transfer of libraries' work; the way to transform communities).
2. The 85th World Conference on Libraries and Information organized by the International Federation of Library Associations and Institutions (IFLA) for the year (2019 AD) in Greece.
3. The international conference entitled (Supporting the Preservation of Documentary Heritage in the Arab Region) organized by UNESCO for the year (2019 AD) in Qatar.
4. An electronic workshop entitled Libraries and electronic resources in the current crisis (Corona epidemic): the al-Abbas's (p) shrine library as a model.
5. The first virtual scientific conference of the Sudanese Association for Libraries and Information / Secretariat of Scientific Affairs, which is held in cooperation with the Arab Federation for Libraries and Information under the slogan (Information institutions services in your crises, demands - challenges - visions of development and prospects).
6. The global scientific symposium organized electronically via (Webinar) by the (Digital Cultural Heritage) Center at Sulaimaniyah Technical University, in cooperation with Oxford University, the University of London, and the University of Qadisiyah, and was entitled (Digitizing and Preserving Library Collections).
7. The symposium organized by the Digital Information Center of the al-Abbas's (p) Holy Shrine Manuscripts Library and House electronically via (Webinar) and in cooperation with the Central Library at Al-Mustansiriya University "Availability of resources for researchers and readers in light of the Corona pandemic".

== Publications ==
In addition to its interest in providing digital services and managing several national projects, the Digital Information Center from time to time authors a new scientific publication that serves researchers and science seekers in support of the scientific movement. Among these publications:

1. University Thesis Guide: A series that includes four parts (so far), each part containing details for more than (7000) theses and theses for postgraduate studies in Iraq (Ph.D., MA, high diploma) in various scientific and human specializations, which are available in their electronic form in the al-Abbas's (p) Holy Shrine Library.
2. English E-Book Guide: A series that includes two parts (so far). Each part contains details of more than (2,500) titles of foreign sources in various scientific and humanitarian disciplines, which have been classified and indexed according to international regulations. Each specialty has been marked with a specific color to provide ease of browsing for the beneficiary. These resources are available in their electronic form in the Ataba Library Holy Abbasid.
