= Eisuke Tachikawa =

- 太刀川 英輔
- Born: 1981 (age 44–45); Yokohama, Kanagawa, Japan
- Education: Hosei University; Keio University
- Occupation: Designer
- Known for: NOSIGNER, Tokyo Bousai, Evolutional Creativity
- Awards: Yamamoto Shichihei Prize (2021); DFA Designer of the Year (2024)
- Website: https://nosigner.com/

Eisuke Tachikawa (Japanese: 太刀川 英輔, romanized: Tachikawa Eisuke; born 1981) is a Japanese designer, design strategist and educator. He is the founder of the design firm NOSIGNER, a board member of the World Design Organization (WDO), and a project professor at the Graduate School of System Design and Management at Keio University. Tachikawa served as president of the Japan Industrial Design Association (JIDA) from 2021 to 2025, becoming the youngest president in the organization's history. He was elected to the WDO Board of Directors in 2023 and re-elected for the 2025–2027 term. In 2024, he became the inaugural recipient of the DFA Designer of the Year award.

== Early life and education ==
Tachikawa was born in Yokohama, Japan. He studied architecture at Hosei University, graduating from its Faculty of Engineering in 2004. He subsequently studied at the Graduate School of Science and Technology at Keio University, completing his master's degree in 2006. While studying architecture, Tachikawa began working under the name NOSIGNER in 2006. His practice developed across multiple disciplines, including product design, graphic design, branding, architecture and spatial design.

== Career ==
=== Disaster preparedness and social design ===
Following the 2011 Tōhoku earthquake and tsunami, Tachikawa initiated OLIVE, an open-source platform for sharing practical knowledge and design ideas for people affected by disasters. The project collected and distributed information on improvised tools, shelters and other techniques that could be used in emergency situations. In 2015, Tachikawa and NOSIGNER worked on Tokyo Bousai (Tokyo Disaster Preparedness), a disaster-preparedness manual commissioned by the Tokyo Metropolitan Government. Tachikawa was involved in the project's art direction, graphic design and editing. The project received the Good Design Gold Award in 2016. His later work has included ADAPTMENT, a design framework addressing climate-change adaptation through approaches inspired by biological evolution and ecosystem resilience.

=== Design policy and international activities ===
In 2014, Tachikawa served as concept director for the Japanese government's Cool Japan Movement Promotion Conference. From 2020, he participated as a creator in developing the basic concept for the Japan Pavilion at Expo 2025 in Osaka, Kansai. In 2021, Tachikawa became president of the Japan Industrial Design Association (JIDA), serving until 2025. During this period, Tokyo hosted the World Design Assembly 2023, the first WDO General Assembly held in Japan in 34 years. Tachikawa was elected to the WDO Board of Directors for the 2023–2025 term. During the term, he served as chair of the Membership Committee and vice-chair of the Programmes Committee. At the World Design Congress in London in 2025, he was re-elected to the WDO Board for the 2025–2027 term.

== Evolutional Creativity ==
Tachikawa developed Evolutional Creativity, a methodology that applies principles inspired by biological evolution to creative thinking and design education. The approach distinguishes between processes analogous to mutation and selection and uses observation of natural and social systems as a framework for developing ideas. He began developing the methodology in 2016. In 2021, Tachikawa published the Japanese-language book Shinka Shikō: Ikinokoru Concept o Tsukuru "Hen'i to Tekiō" (進化思考 生き残るコンセプトをつくる「変異と適応」), presenting the methodology in book form. The book received the 30th Yamamoto Shichihei Prize in 2021. A revised and expanded edition, supervised from a biological perspective by evolutionary biologist Masakado Kawata of Tohoku University, was published in 2023. The methodology has subsequently been introduced in companies and educational institutions and the book has been translated into Chinese, Korean and Indonesian. In 2023, Tachikawa presented a paper, "Evolutional Creativity: Evolutionary Principles for Creative Learning", at the WDO Research and Education Forum in Tokyo.

== Academic career ==
Tachikawa has taught design and innovation at universities in Japan and internationally. He became a project professor at the Graduate School of System Design and Management at Keio University in 2024. His international educational activities have included collaborations with the Bandung Institute of Technology (ITB) in Indonesia. In recognition of his contribution to making academic activities at ITB more transdisciplinary, innovative and socially impactful, the university awarded Tachikawa the Ganesa Widya Jasa Adiutama award.

== Awards and recognition ==
In 2024, the Hong Kong Design Centre introduced the DFA Designer of the Year award. Tachikawa was selected as its inaugural recipient. The award recognized his use of design to address social issues including climate change and disaster preparedness. Selected awards and distinctions include:

- 2025 – Ganesa Widya Jasa Adiutama, Bandung Institute of Technology
- 2024 – DFA Designer of the Year, inaugural recipient
- 2021 – 30th Yamamoto Shichihei Prize, for Evolutional Creativity
- 2016 – Good Design Gold Award, for Tokyo Bousai
- 2011 – DFA Design for Asia Award, Grand Award
- 2009 – Pentawards, Platinum Award
- 2009 – Art Directors Club Young Guns 7

== Selected works ==
- OLIVE (2011) – open-source disaster relief information platform
- Tokyo Bousai (2015) – disaster preparedness project for the Tokyo Metropolitan Government
- PANDAID (2020) – open-source design initiative responding to the COVID-19 pandemic
- ADAPTMENT – climate adaptation design framework

== Publications ==
- Design and Innovation: 50 Ways to Create the Future (デザインと革新 未来をつくる50の思考). PIE International, 2016. ISBN 978-4-7562-4715-6.
- Evolutional Creativity: Creating Concepts that Survive through Mutation and Adaptation (進化思考 生き残るコンセプトをつくる「変異と適応」). Ama no Kaze, 2021. ISBN 978-4-909934-00-0.
- Evolutional Creativity: Revised and Expanded Edition (進化思考［増補改訂版］ 生き残るコンセプトをつくる「変異と選択」). Supervised by Masakado Kawata. Ama no Kaze, 2023. ISBN 978-4-909934-03-1.

== See also ==
- World Design Organization
- Social design
- Design strategy
