= Library of Al-Abbas Holy Shrine =

Library in Iraq

- 32°37′00″N 44°02′11″E
- Location: Karbala, Iraq, Iraq
- Type: Research library
- Established: 1963
- Branch of: Al-Abbas Holy Shrine

Collection
- Size: About 250,000 in general

Other information
- Employees: 160 employee as to 25 June 2019
- Website: https://alkafeel.net/library/

The Library of Al-Abbas Holy Shrine is a research library located within Al Abbas Holy Shrine in the old city of Karbala, Iraq. It contains books, ebooks, manuscripts and rare books in various disciplines and languages. The library holds about 250,000 works.

== History ==
=== Prior to 2006 ===
The library was first established in 1963 by Sayyid Abbas Al-Hussayni Al-Kashani, and it was holding about 5,000 books in its shelves, most of them were damaged or stolen during the 1991 uprisings in Iraq against Saddam Hussein's regime, and it was neglected since then up to the reopening in 2006.

=== Post 2006 ===
In 2006 it was reopened after 3 years of being closed after the Iraq war in 2003, the reopening was heavily supported by Sayyid Ali al-Husseini al-Sistani. The new library included new divisions that were not existed in the old library, many specialized divisions and units were developed to cope with the requirements of the new era after the Iraq war and to handle the scientific requirements by the students of the Iraqi Universities and researchers.

== Collecting the manuscripts ==
Nearly five thousand written copies classified as precious, rare and of heritage were collected in the Library within the period of 2009 to 2014, and this operation was done in three stages:

=== The first stage ===
The first stage: to collect the manuscripts without a specific kind of scripts. The goal was to safeguard and collect what can be collected from the scattered, damaged, stolen treasures, or those smuggled out of the country because of successive wars, instability or economic and cultural reasons. The last factor explains the status of ignorance of their value, importance and scarcity leading to their damage, another example is what happened during the uprising of Sha'ban in 1411 / 1991, when the soldiers and members of the Baathists made tea in the courtyard of Al-Abbas Holy Shrine on the fire made out from burnt rare books and manuscripts, therefore this experience made the library put in the priorities of work to collect what can be collected and therefore experts were hired for this work.

=== The second stage ===
The second stage: The treatment, maintenance and safeguard of the manuscript within the proper conditions. For this purpose the house of manuscripts sent to known European countries in this area its competent affiliates in order to make their training and get recognized specialization diplomas. The House also bought a private "hospital" to address and treat manuscripts according to the latest known technologies, and its affiliates are today the leading specialists in this regard in Iraq, which allow them to maintain a number of known libraries in different provinces of Iraq.

=== The third stage ===
The last stage included the picturization, classification, the indexing of the manuscript and the historical, scientific and author identification to configure it, to facilitate its delivery and to make it accessible to the hands of researchers and investigators.

== Centers and units ==
In addition to the main reading hall, the library includes the listed divisions below:

1. Acquisition unit
2. Indexing and Information Systems
3. Digital information center
4. Authoring and Studies
5. Restoration of manuscripts
6. Photocopy and classification of manuscripts
7. Translation unit
8. Bookbinding
9. Human resources

== Library publications ==
=== Arabic publications ===
1. دور الخرائط المفاهيمية في تكوين المفاهيم الرئيسية لعمليات الفهرسة فــي المكتبات
2. بحوث المؤتمر الدولي في المعلومات والمكتبات ج2
3. بحوث المؤتمر الدولي في المعلومات والمكتبات ج1
4. البصرة في مجلة لغة العرب
5. النجف في مجلة لغة العرب
6. بغداد في مجلة لغة العرب (القسم الرابع)
7. ماوصل الينا من كتاب مدينة العلم
8. نهج البلاغة المختار من كلام امير المؤمنين
9. بغداد في مجلة لغة العرب (القسم الثالث)
10. ابو الفضل العباس في الشعر العربي
11. بغداد في مجلة لغة العرب (القسم الثاني)
12. مانزل من القرآن في علي بن ابي طالب
13. درر المطالب وغرر المناقب
14. الدرر البهية في تراجم علماء الامامية الجزء الثاني
15. الدرر البهية في تراجم علماء الامامية الجزء الاول
16. شرح قصيدة محمد المجذوب (على قبر معاوية)
17. سند الخصام
18. دليل الأطاريح الجامعية ج2
19. الأربعون حديثاً (الطبعة الثانية)
20. رسالة في آداب المجاورة
21. دليل الأطاريح الجامعية ج1
22. منار الهدى الجزء الثاني
23. منار الهدى الجزء الأول
24. مكارم أخلاق النبي والأئمة
25. معارج الأفهام إلى علم الكلام
26. كشف الاستار
27. ديوان السيد سليمان الكبير
28. المجالس الحسينية
29. الصولة العلوية على القصيدة البغدادية
30. مجالي اللطف بارض الطف
31. الأربعون حديثاً

=== English publications ===
1. English eBooks Catalog

== Other publications of Al-Abbas Holy Shrine ==
=== English publications ===
1. AL-Abbas bin Ali (P.B.U.H.) The Staunch Advocate of Dignity and Sacrifice in Islam
2. Backbiting & Its Enormous Effects
3. Truthfulness Is a Survival Compass in a World in Crisis
4. Patience Profuse Offer & Abundant Welfare
5. A Collection Of Visits
6. (Marriage) (Sacred Contract & Delicious Fruits) Marriage Privileges
7. (SHYNESS & INSOLENCE) Between (Intellect & Legislature)
8. Humbleness – The Head Of Goodness & The Basis Of Worshiping
9. Pilgrims’ Principles towards the Massive Arba’een Pilgrimage
10. The Fruits of the Arba’een Pilgrimage
11. Modesty and Degradation Between Intellect and Sharia
